

509001–509100 

|-bgcolor=#fefefe
| 509001 ||  || — || April 4, 2005 || Catalina || CSS || H || align=right data-sort-value="0.68" | 680 m || 
|-id=002 bgcolor=#fefefe
| 509002 ||  || — || March 16, 2005 || Catalina || CSS || H || align=right data-sort-value="0.71" | 710 m || 
|-id=003 bgcolor=#fefefe
| 509003 ||  || — || April 11, 2005 || Kitt Peak || Spacewatch ||  || align=right data-sort-value="0.58" | 580 m || 
|-id=004 bgcolor=#E9E9E9
| 509004 ||  || — || March 10, 2005 || Mount Lemmon || Mount Lemmon Survey ||  || align=right | 1.5 km || 
|-id=005 bgcolor=#fefefe
| 509005 ||  || — || May 3, 2005 || Kitt Peak || Spacewatch || H || align=right data-sort-value="0.54" | 540 m || 
|-id=006 bgcolor=#E9E9E9
| 509006 ||  || — || May 3, 2005 || Kitt Peak || Spacewatch ||  || align=right | 1.8 km || 
|-id=007 bgcolor=#fefefe
| 509007 ||  || — || May 3, 2005 || Kitt Peak || Spacewatch ||  || align=right data-sort-value="0.71" | 710 m || 
|-id=008 bgcolor=#fefefe
| 509008 ||  || — || May 4, 2005 || Kitt Peak || Spacewatch ||  || align=right data-sort-value="0.69" | 690 m || 
|-id=009 bgcolor=#E9E9E9
| 509009 ||  || — || May 9, 2005 || Anderson Mesa || LONEOS ||  || align=right | 2.2 km || 
|-id=010 bgcolor=#E9E9E9
| 509010 ||  || — || May 3, 2005 || Kitt Peak || Spacewatch ||  || align=right | 1.3 km || 
|-id=011 bgcolor=#d6d6d6
| 509011 ||  || — || June 13, 2005 || Kitt Peak || Spacewatch || EUP || align=right | 3.5 km || 
|-id=012 bgcolor=#fefefe
| 509012 ||  || — || June 13, 2005 || Mount Lemmon || Mount Lemmon Survey ||  || align=right data-sort-value="0.62" | 620 m || 
|-id=013 bgcolor=#fefefe
| 509013 ||  || — || June 29, 2005 || Palomar || NEAT ||  || align=right data-sort-value="0.80" | 800 m || 
|-id=014 bgcolor=#d6d6d6
| 509014 ||  || — || June 30, 2005 || Kitt Peak || Spacewatch ||  || align=right | 3.2 km || 
|-id=015 bgcolor=#fefefe
| 509015 ||  || — || June 29, 2005 || Kitt Peak || Spacewatch ||  || align=right data-sort-value="0.59" | 590 m || 
|-id=016 bgcolor=#d6d6d6
| 509016 ||  || — || June 13, 2005 || Mount Lemmon || Mount Lemmon Survey ||  || align=right | 2.1 km || 
|-id=017 bgcolor=#fefefe
| 509017 ||  || — || June 29, 2005 || Kitt Peak || Spacewatch || H || align=right data-sort-value="0.67" | 670 m || 
|-id=018 bgcolor=#FA8072
| 509018 Wiese ||  ||  || July 1, 2005 || Needville || Needville Obs. ||  || align=right | 1.7 km || 
|-id=019 bgcolor=#d6d6d6
| 509019 ||  || — || June 18, 2005 || Mount Lemmon || Mount Lemmon Survey ||  || align=right | 2.3 km || 
|-id=020 bgcolor=#d6d6d6
| 509020 ||  || — || July 4, 2005 || Mount Lemmon || Mount Lemmon Survey ||  || align=right | 2.7 km || 
|-id=021 bgcolor=#fefefe
| 509021 ||  || — || July 5, 2005 || Kitt Peak || Spacewatch ||  || align=right data-sort-value="0.70" | 700 m || 
|-id=022 bgcolor=#d6d6d6
| 509022 ||  || — || July 10, 2005 || Kitt Peak || Spacewatch ||  || align=right | 2.5 km || 
|-id=023 bgcolor=#d6d6d6
| 509023 ||  || — || July 4, 2005 || Kitt Peak || Spacewatch ||  || align=right | 3.0 km || 
|-id=024 bgcolor=#FA8072
| 509024 ||  || — || August 1, 2005 || Siding Spring || SSS ||  || align=right | 1.2 km || 
|-id=025 bgcolor=#FA8072
| 509025 ||  || — || August 7, 2005 || Siding Spring || SSS ||  || align=right data-sort-value="0.91" | 910 m || 
|-id=026 bgcolor=#fefefe
| 509026 ||  || — || August 25, 2005 || Palomar || NEAT ||  || align=right data-sort-value="0.84" | 840 m || 
|-id=027 bgcolor=#fefefe
| 509027 ||  || — || August 25, 2005 || Palomar || NEAT || MAS || align=right data-sort-value="0.79" | 790 m || 
|-id=028 bgcolor=#fefefe
| 509028 ||  || — || August 26, 2005 || Anderson Mesa || LONEOS ||  || align=right data-sort-value="0.94" | 940 m || 
|-id=029 bgcolor=#fefefe
| 509029 ||  || — || August 25, 2005 || Palomar || NEAT ||  || align=right data-sort-value="0.79" | 790 m || 
|-id=030 bgcolor=#fefefe
| 509030 ||  || — || August 26, 2005 || Anderson Mesa || LONEOS ||  || align=right data-sort-value="0.92" | 920 m || 
|-id=031 bgcolor=#fefefe
| 509031 ||  || — || August 25, 2005 || Palomar || NEAT ||  || align=right data-sort-value="0.80" | 800 m || 
|-id=032 bgcolor=#fefefe
| 509032 ||  || — || August 29, 2005 || Socorro || LINEAR ||  || align=right data-sort-value="0.75" | 750 m || 
|-id=033 bgcolor=#fefefe
| 509033 ||  || — || August 27, 2005 || Anderson Mesa || LONEOS ||  || align=right data-sort-value="0.87" | 870 m || 
|-id=034 bgcolor=#fefefe
| 509034 ||  || — || September 13, 2005 || Kitt Peak || Spacewatch || NYS || align=right data-sort-value="0.61" | 610 m || 
|-id=035 bgcolor=#d6d6d6
| 509035 ||  || — || August 30, 2005 || Kitt Peak || Spacewatch ||  || align=right | 2.4 km || 
|-id=036 bgcolor=#fefefe
| 509036 ||  || — || September 23, 2005 || Kitt Peak || Spacewatch || V || align=right data-sort-value="0.80" | 800 m || 
|-id=037 bgcolor=#fefefe
| 509037 ||  || — || September 25, 2005 || Catalina || CSS || NYS || align=right data-sort-value="0.61" | 610 m || 
|-id=038 bgcolor=#d6d6d6
| 509038 ||  || — || September 23, 2005 || Kitt Peak || Spacewatch ||  || align=right | 2.7 km || 
|-id=039 bgcolor=#fefefe
| 509039 ||  || — || September 24, 2005 || Kitt Peak || Spacewatch || MAS || align=right data-sort-value="0.53" | 530 m || 
|-id=040 bgcolor=#fefefe
| 509040 ||  || — || September 29, 2005 || Kitt Peak || Spacewatch ||  || align=right data-sort-value="0.66" | 660 m || 
|-id=041 bgcolor=#d6d6d6
| 509041 ||  || — || September 29, 2005 || Mount Lemmon || Mount Lemmon Survey ||  || align=right | 2.4 km || 
|-id=042 bgcolor=#fefefe
| 509042 ||  || — || September 25, 2005 || Kitt Peak || Spacewatch || MAS || align=right data-sort-value="0.65" | 650 m || 
|-id=043 bgcolor=#d6d6d6
| 509043 ||  || — || September 25, 2005 || Kitt Peak || Spacewatch || THB || align=right | 2.3 km || 
|-id=044 bgcolor=#d6d6d6
| 509044 ||  || — || September 25, 2005 || Kitt Peak || Spacewatch ||  || align=right | 2.6 km || 
|-id=045 bgcolor=#d6d6d6
| 509045 ||  || — || September 29, 2005 || Kitt Peak || Spacewatch ||  || align=right | 3.5 km || 
|-id=046 bgcolor=#d6d6d6
| 509046 ||  || — || September 29, 2005 || Kitt Peak || Spacewatch ||  || align=right | 2.1 km || 
|-id=047 bgcolor=#fefefe
| 509047 ||  || — || September 29, 2005 || Mount Lemmon || Mount Lemmon Survey ||  || align=right data-sort-value="0.77" | 770 m || 
|-id=048 bgcolor=#d6d6d6
| 509048 ||  || — || September 30, 2005 || Kitt Peak || Spacewatch ||  || align=right | 2.3 km || 
|-id=049 bgcolor=#fefefe
| 509049 ||  || — || September 29, 2005 || Kitt Peak || Spacewatch ||  || align=right data-sort-value="0.82" | 820 m || 
|-id=050 bgcolor=#d6d6d6
| 509050 ||  || — || September 30, 2005 || Mount Lemmon || Mount Lemmon Survey || THM || align=right | 2.0 km || 
|-id=051 bgcolor=#fefefe
| 509051 ||  || — || September 30, 2005 || Mount Lemmon || Mount Lemmon Survey ||  || align=right data-sort-value="0.60" | 600 m || 
|-id=052 bgcolor=#d6d6d6
| 509052 ||  || — || September 1, 2005 || Kitt Peak || Spacewatch ||  || align=right | 2.3 km || 
|-id=053 bgcolor=#d6d6d6
| 509053 ||  || — || September 25, 2005 || Apache Point || A. C. Becker ||  || align=right | 2.4 km || 
|-id=054 bgcolor=#fefefe
| 509054 ||  || — || September 26, 2005 || Kitt Peak || Spacewatch ||  || align=right data-sort-value="0.61" | 610 m || 
|-id=055 bgcolor=#d6d6d6
| 509055 ||  || — || September 29, 2005 || Kitt Peak || Spacewatch ||  || align=right | 2.6 km || 
|-id=056 bgcolor=#fefefe
| 509056 ||  || — || October 1, 2005 || Cordell-Lorenz || D. T. Durig ||  || align=right data-sort-value="0.57" | 570 m || 
|-id=057 bgcolor=#fefefe
| 509057 ||  || — || October 1, 2005 || Kitt Peak || Spacewatch || NYS || align=right data-sort-value="0.55" | 550 m || 
|-id=058 bgcolor=#fefefe
| 509058 ||  || — || September 10, 2005 || Anderson Mesa || LONEOS ||  || align=right data-sort-value="0.83" | 830 m || 
|-id=059 bgcolor=#fefefe
| 509059 ||  || — || October 6, 2005 || Mount Lemmon || Mount Lemmon Survey ||  || align=right data-sort-value="0.75" | 750 m || 
|-id=060 bgcolor=#fefefe
| 509060 ||  || — || October 5, 2005 || Socorro || LINEAR ||  || align=right data-sort-value="0.68" | 680 m || 
|-id=061 bgcolor=#fefefe
| 509061 ||  || — || October 6, 2005 || Catalina || CSS ||  || align=right data-sort-value="0.71" | 710 m || 
|-id=062 bgcolor=#d6d6d6
| 509062 ||  || — || October 6, 2005 || Mount Lemmon || Mount Lemmon Survey || EOS || align=right | 1.6 km || 
|-id=063 bgcolor=#fefefe
| 509063 ||  || — || October 7, 2005 || Mount Lemmon || Mount Lemmon Survey || NYS || align=right data-sort-value="0.56" | 560 m || 
|-id=064 bgcolor=#fefefe
| 509064 ||  || — || October 7, 2005 || Kitt Peak || Spacewatch ||  || align=right data-sort-value="0.62" | 620 m || 
|-id=065 bgcolor=#d6d6d6
| 509065 ||  || — || September 27, 2005 || Kitt Peak || Spacewatch ||  || align=right | 2.7 km || 
|-id=066 bgcolor=#d6d6d6
| 509066 ||  || — || October 7, 2005 || Kitt Peak || Spacewatch ||  || align=right | 1.9 km || 
|-id=067 bgcolor=#fefefe
| 509067 ||  || — || October 7, 2005 || Kitt Peak || Spacewatch || NYS || align=right data-sort-value="0.52" | 520 m || 
|-id=068 bgcolor=#fefefe
| 509068 ||  || — || September 29, 2005 || Mount Lemmon || Mount Lemmon Survey ||  || align=right data-sort-value="0.70" | 700 m || 
|-id=069 bgcolor=#d6d6d6
| 509069 ||  || — || October 8, 2005 || Kitt Peak || Spacewatch || THM || align=right | 1.9 km || 
|-id=070 bgcolor=#fefefe
| 509070 ||  || — || October 6, 2005 || Kitt Peak || Spacewatch ||  || align=right data-sort-value="0.77" | 770 m || 
|-id=071 bgcolor=#d6d6d6
| 509071 ||  || — || October 6, 2005 || Anderson Mesa || LONEOS ||  || align=right | 3.1 km || 
|-id=072 bgcolor=#d6d6d6
| 509072 ||  || — || October 10, 2005 || Kitt Peak || Spacewatch ||  || align=right | 2.1 km || 
|-id=073 bgcolor=#FFC2E0
| 509073 ||  || — || October 27, 2005 || Kitt Peak || Spacewatch || APO || align=right data-sort-value="0.25" | 250 m || 
|-id=074 bgcolor=#E9E9E9
| 509074 ||  || — || October 22, 2005 || Kitt Peak || Spacewatch ||  || align=right data-sort-value="0.65" | 650 m || 
|-id=075 bgcolor=#d6d6d6
| 509075 ||  || — || October 22, 2005 || Kitt Peak || Spacewatch ||  || align=right | 3.1 km || 
|-id=076 bgcolor=#d6d6d6
| 509076 ||  || — || October 22, 2005 || Kitt Peak || Spacewatch ||  || align=right | 3.0 km || 
|-id=077 bgcolor=#fefefe
| 509077 ||  || — || October 23, 2005 || Kitt Peak || Spacewatch || V || align=right data-sort-value="0.43" | 430 m || 
|-id=078 bgcolor=#d6d6d6
| 509078 ||  || — || October 24, 2005 || Kitt Peak || Spacewatch ||  || align=right | 2.8 km || 
|-id=079 bgcolor=#fefefe
| 509079 ||  || — || October 22, 2005 || Kitt Peak || Spacewatch ||  || align=right data-sort-value="0.57" | 570 m || 
|-id=080 bgcolor=#fefefe
| 509080 ||  || — || October 25, 2005 || Mount Lemmon || Mount Lemmon Survey || NYS || align=right data-sort-value="0.64" | 640 m || 
|-id=081 bgcolor=#d6d6d6
| 509081 ||  || — || October 25, 2005 || Mount Lemmon || Mount Lemmon Survey ||  || align=right | 1.9 km || 
|-id=082 bgcolor=#fefefe
| 509082 ||  || — || October 22, 2005 || Kitt Peak || Spacewatch ||  || align=right data-sort-value="0.70" | 700 m || 
|-id=083 bgcolor=#fefefe
| 509083 ||  || — || October 25, 2005 || Kitt Peak || Spacewatch ||  || align=right data-sort-value="0.71" | 710 m || 
|-id=084 bgcolor=#d6d6d6
| 509084 ||  || — || October 26, 2005 || Kitt Peak || Spacewatch ||  || align=right | 2.5 km || 
|-id=085 bgcolor=#fefefe
| 509085 ||  || — || October 22, 2005 || Palomar || NEAT ||  || align=right | 1.00 km || 
|-id=086 bgcolor=#fefefe
| 509086 ||  || — || October 23, 2005 || Catalina || CSS ||  || align=right data-sort-value="0.82" | 820 m || 
|-id=087 bgcolor=#d6d6d6
| 509087 ||  || — || October 25, 2005 || Mount Lemmon || Mount Lemmon Survey ||  || align=right | 2.2 km || 
|-id=088 bgcolor=#fefefe
| 509088 ||  || — || October 25, 2005 || Kitt Peak || Spacewatch ||  || align=right data-sort-value="0.59" | 590 m || 
|-id=089 bgcolor=#d6d6d6
| 509089 ||  || — || October 25, 2005 || Kitt Peak || Spacewatch ||  || align=right | 2.5 km || 
|-id=090 bgcolor=#d6d6d6
| 509090 ||  || — || October 25, 2005 || Kitt Peak || Spacewatch ||  || align=right | 2.7 km || 
|-id=091 bgcolor=#d6d6d6
| 509091 ||  || — || October 25, 2005 || Kitt Peak || Spacewatch ||  || align=right | 2.5 km || 
|-id=092 bgcolor=#d6d6d6
| 509092 ||  || — || October 4, 2005 || Mount Lemmon || Mount Lemmon Survey ||  || align=right | 2.2 km || 
|-id=093 bgcolor=#d6d6d6
| 509093 ||  || — || October 29, 2005 || Catalina || CSS ||  || align=right | 4.0 km || 
|-id=094 bgcolor=#d6d6d6
| 509094 ||  || — || October 1, 2005 || Mount Lemmon || Mount Lemmon Survey ||  || align=right | 2.9 km || 
|-id=095 bgcolor=#d6d6d6
| 509095 ||  || — || October 1, 2005 || Kitt Peak || Spacewatch ||  || align=right | 2.5 km || 
|-id=096 bgcolor=#d6d6d6
| 509096 ||  || — || October 25, 2005 || Kitt Peak || Spacewatch ||  || align=right | 2.0 km || 
|-id=097 bgcolor=#d6d6d6
| 509097 ||  || — || October 27, 2005 || Mount Lemmon || Mount Lemmon Survey ||  || align=right | 2.2 km || 
|-id=098 bgcolor=#E9E9E9
| 509098 ||  || — || October 30, 2005 || Socorro || LINEAR ||  || align=right data-sort-value="0.87" | 870 m || 
|-id=099 bgcolor=#fefefe
| 509099 ||  || — || October 30, 2005 || Kitt Peak || Spacewatch || NYS || align=right data-sort-value="0.72" | 720 m || 
|-id=100 bgcolor=#fefefe
| 509100 ||  || — || September 30, 2005 || Mount Lemmon || Mount Lemmon Survey ||  || align=right data-sort-value="0.69" | 690 m || 
|}

509101–509200 

|-bgcolor=#d6d6d6
| 509101 ||  || — || September 30, 2005 || Kitt Peak || Spacewatch ||  || align=right | 1.9 km || 
|-id=102 bgcolor=#FFC2E0
| 509102 ||  || — || November 12, 2005 || Socorro || LINEAR || AMO || align=right data-sort-value="0.43" | 430 m || 
|-id=103 bgcolor=#d6d6d6
| 509103 ||  || — || October 1, 2005 || Mount Lemmon || Mount Lemmon Survey || VER || align=right | 2.4 km || 
|-id=104 bgcolor=#d6d6d6
| 509104 ||  || — || October 25, 2005 || Kitt Peak || Spacewatch ||  || align=right | 2.0 km || 
|-id=105 bgcolor=#fefefe
| 509105 ||  || — || November 6, 2005 || Mount Lemmon || Mount Lemmon Survey ||  || align=right data-sort-value="0.65" | 650 m || 
|-id=106 bgcolor=#d6d6d6
| 509106 ||  || — || October 1, 2005 || Mount Lemmon || Mount Lemmon Survey ||  || align=right | 1.9 km || 
|-id=107 bgcolor=#d6d6d6
| 509107 ||  || — || November 1, 2005 || Apache Point || A. C. Becker ||  || align=right | 2.6 km || 
|-id=108 bgcolor=#fefefe
| 509108 ||  || — || November 1, 2005 || Kitt Peak || Spacewatch ||  || align=right data-sort-value="0.73" | 730 m || 
|-id=109 bgcolor=#d6d6d6
| 509109 ||  || — || November 12, 2005 || Kitt Peak || Spacewatch ||  || align=right | 2.9 km || 
|-id=110 bgcolor=#E9E9E9
| 509110 ||  || — || November 21, 2005 || Kitt Peak || Spacewatch ||  || align=right data-sort-value="0.77" | 770 m || 
|-id=111 bgcolor=#d6d6d6
| 509111 ||  || — || November 22, 2005 || Kitt Peak || Spacewatch || THM || align=right | 2.0 km || 
|-id=112 bgcolor=#d6d6d6
| 509112 ||  || — || November 22, 2005 || Kitt Peak || Spacewatch || THM || align=right | 2.0 km || 
|-id=113 bgcolor=#E9E9E9
| 509113 ||  || — || November 22, 2005 || Kitt Peak || Spacewatch ||  || align=right data-sort-value="0.85" | 850 m || 
|-id=114 bgcolor=#fefefe
| 509114 ||  || — || November 12, 2005 || Kitt Peak || Spacewatch ||  || align=right data-sort-value="0.94" | 940 m || 
|-id=115 bgcolor=#d6d6d6
| 509115 ||  || — || October 30, 2005 || Mount Lemmon || Mount Lemmon Survey ||  || align=right | 2.7 km || 
|-id=116 bgcolor=#fefefe
| 509116 ||  || — || November 25, 2005 || Mount Lemmon || Mount Lemmon Survey ||  || align=right data-sort-value="0.71" | 710 m || 
|-id=117 bgcolor=#d6d6d6
| 509117 ||  || — || October 29, 2005 || Mount Lemmon || Mount Lemmon Survey ||  || align=right | 2.9 km || 
|-id=118 bgcolor=#fefefe
| 509118 ||  || — || October 28, 2005 || Kitt Peak || Spacewatch || NYS || align=right data-sort-value="0.62" | 620 m || 
|-id=119 bgcolor=#fefefe
| 509119 ||  || — || November 30, 2005 || Kitt Peak || Spacewatch ||  || align=right data-sort-value="0.82" | 820 m || 
|-id=120 bgcolor=#fefefe
| 509120 ||  || — || November 22, 2005 || Kitt Peak || Spacewatch || MAS || align=right data-sort-value="0.71" | 710 m || 
|-id=121 bgcolor=#fefefe
| 509121 ||  || — || November 9, 2005 || Kitt Peak || Spacewatch ||  || align=right data-sort-value="0.82" | 820 m || 
|-id=122 bgcolor=#d6d6d6
| 509122 ||  || — || December 8, 2005 || Kitt Peak || Spacewatch ||  || align=right | 2.8 km || 
|-id=123 bgcolor=#E9E9E9
| 509123 ||  || — || December 10, 2005 || Kitt Peak || Spacewatch ||  || align=right data-sort-value="0.89" | 890 m || 
|-id=124 bgcolor=#E9E9E9
| 509124 ||  || — || December 25, 2005 || Kitt Peak || Spacewatch ||  || align=right data-sort-value="0.62" | 620 m || 
|-id=125 bgcolor=#E9E9E9
| 509125 ||  || — || December 27, 2005 || Kitt Peak || Spacewatch ||  || align=right data-sort-value="0.92" | 920 m || 
|-id=126 bgcolor=#d6d6d6
| 509126 ||  || — || December 27, 2005 || Kitt Peak || Spacewatch || HYG || align=right | 2.1 km || 
|-id=127 bgcolor=#E9E9E9
| 509127 ||  || — || December 29, 2005 || Kitt Peak || Spacewatch ||  || align=right data-sort-value="0.92" | 920 m || 
|-id=128 bgcolor=#d6d6d6
| 509128 ||  || — || November 1, 2005 || Catalina || CSS ||  || align=right | 3.1 km || 
|-id=129 bgcolor=#d6d6d6
| 509129 ||  || — || December 21, 2005 || Kitt Peak || Spacewatch ||  || align=right | 2.5 km || 
|-id=130 bgcolor=#E9E9E9
| 509130 ||  || — || December 25, 2005 || Kitt Peak || Spacewatch ||  || align=right data-sort-value="0.77" | 770 m || 
|-id=131 bgcolor=#E9E9E9
| 509131 ||  || — || December 25, 2005 || Mount Lemmon || Mount Lemmon Survey || EUN || align=right data-sort-value="0.86" | 860 m || 
|-id=132 bgcolor=#E9E9E9
| 509132 ||  || — || November 28, 2005 || Mount Lemmon || Mount Lemmon Survey ||  || align=right data-sort-value="0.91" | 910 m || 
|-id=133 bgcolor=#E9E9E9
| 509133 ||  || — || January 5, 2006 || Mount Lemmon || Mount Lemmon Survey ||  || align=right data-sort-value="0.56" | 560 m || 
|-id=134 bgcolor=#E9E9E9
| 509134 ||  || — || January 5, 2006 || Catalina || CSS ||  || align=right | 1.0 km || 
|-id=135 bgcolor=#d6d6d6
| 509135 ||  || — || November 30, 2005 || Mount Lemmon || Mount Lemmon Survey ||  || align=right | 2.9 km || 
|-id=136 bgcolor=#E9E9E9
| 509136 ||  || — || December 25, 2005 || Kitt Peak || Spacewatch ||  || align=right data-sort-value="0.72" | 720 m || 
|-id=137 bgcolor=#E9E9E9
| 509137 ||  || — || January 8, 2006 || Mount Lemmon || Mount Lemmon Survey ||  || align=right | 1.0 km || 
|-id=138 bgcolor=#E9E9E9
| 509138 ||  || — || January 4, 2006 || Kitt Peak || Spacewatch ||  || align=right data-sort-value="0.90" | 900 m || 
|-id=139 bgcolor=#E9E9E9
| 509139 ||  || — || January 5, 2006 || Mount Lemmon || Mount Lemmon Survey ||  || align=right data-sort-value="0.77" | 770 m || 
|-id=140 bgcolor=#C2FFFF
| 509140 ||  || — || January 7, 2006 || Mount Lemmon || Mount Lemmon Survey || L5 || align=right | 9.2 km || 
|-id=141 bgcolor=#E9E9E9
| 509141 ||  || — || January 22, 2006 || Mount Lemmon || Mount Lemmon Survey ||  || align=right data-sort-value="0.57" | 570 m || 
|-id=142 bgcolor=#E9E9E9
| 509142 ||  || — || January 23, 2006 || Kitt Peak || Spacewatch ||  || align=right data-sort-value="0.76" | 760 m || 
|-id=143 bgcolor=#E9E9E9
| 509143 ||  || — || January 23, 2006 || Mount Lemmon || Mount Lemmon Survey ||  || align=right data-sort-value="0.71" | 710 m || 
|-id=144 bgcolor=#C2FFFF
| 509144 ||  || — || January 23, 2006 || Mount Lemmon || Mount Lemmon Survey || L5 || align=right | 11 km || 
|-id=145 bgcolor=#E9E9E9
| 509145 ||  || — || January 25, 2006 || Kitt Peak || Spacewatch ||  || align=right data-sort-value="0.75" | 750 m || 
|-id=146 bgcolor=#E9E9E9
| 509146 ||  || — || January 25, 2006 || Kitt Peak || Spacewatch ||  || align=right data-sort-value="0.89" | 890 m || 
|-id=147 bgcolor=#E9E9E9
| 509147 ||  || — || January 26, 2006 || Kitt Peak || Spacewatch || critical || align=right data-sort-value="0.65" | 650 m || 
|-id=148 bgcolor=#E9E9E9
| 509148 ||  || — || January 26, 2006 || Mount Lemmon || Mount Lemmon Survey ||  || align=right data-sort-value="0.56" | 560 m || 
|-id=149 bgcolor=#E9E9E9
| 509149 ||  || — || January 26, 2006 || Kitt Peak || Spacewatch ||  || align=right data-sort-value="0.79" | 790 m || 
|-id=150 bgcolor=#E9E9E9
| 509150 ||  || — || January 31, 2006 || Catalina || CSS ||  || align=right | 1.0 km || 
|-id=151 bgcolor=#E9E9E9
| 509151 ||  || — || January 31, 2006 || Kitt Peak || Spacewatch ||  || align=right data-sort-value="0.75" | 750 m || 
|-id=152 bgcolor=#E9E9E9
| 509152 ||  || — || January 31, 2006 || Kitt Peak || Spacewatch ||  || align=right data-sort-value="0.94" | 940 m || 
|-id=153 bgcolor=#E9E9E9
| 509153 ||  || — || January 25, 2006 || Kitt Peak || Spacewatch ||  || align=right data-sort-value="0.71" | 710 m || 
|-id=154 bgcolor=#E9E9E9
| 509154 ||  || — || February 1, 2006 || Kitt Peak || Spacewatch ||  || align=right data-sort-value="0.62" | 620 m || 
|-id=155 bgcolor=#E9E9E9
| 509155 ||  || — || February 3, 2006 || Kitt Peak || Spacewatch ||  || align=right data-sort-value="0.78" | 780 m || 
|-id=156 bgcolor=#E9E9E9
| 509156 ||  || — || February 22, 2006 || Catalina || CSS ||  || align=right | 1.4 km || 
|-id=157 bgcolor=#E9E9E9
| 509157 ||  || — || February 21, 2006 || Mount Lemmon || Mount Lemmon Survey ||  || align=right | 1.5 km || 
|-id=158 bgcolor=#E9E9E9
| 509158 ||  || — || February 20, 2006 || Kitt Peak || Spacewatch ||  || align=right data-sort-value="0.91" | 910 m || 
|-id=159 bgcolor=#E9E9E9
| 509159 ||  || — || February 24, 2006 || Mount Lemmon || Mount Lemmon Survey ||  || align=right data-sort-value="0.73" | 730 m || 
|-id=160 bgcolor=#E9E9E9
| 509160 ||  || — || February 24, 2006 || Kitt Peak || Spacewatch ||  || align=right | 1.1 km || 
|-id=161 bgcolor=#E9E9E9
| 509161 ||  || — || February 25, 2006 || Kitt Peak || Spacewatch ||  || align=right data-sort-value="0.82" | 820 m || 
|-id=162 bgcolor=#E9E9E9
| 509162 ||  || — || February 25, 2006 || Kitt Peak || Spacewatch ||  || align=right | 1.2 km || 
|-id=163 bgcolor=#E9E9E9
| 509163 ||  || — || January 26, 2006 || Kitt Peak || Spacewatch ||  || align=right data-sort-value="0.71" | 710 m || 
|-id=164 bgcolor=#E9E9E9
| 509164 ||  || — || February 25, 2006 || Kitt Peak || Spacewatch ||  || align=right data-sort-value="0.81" | 810 m || 
|-id=165 bgcolor=#E9E9E9
| 509165 ||  || — || March 2, 2006 || Kitt Peak || Spacewatch ||  || align=right data-sort-value="0.75" | 750 m || 
|-id=166 bgcolor=#E9E9E9
| 509166 ||  || — || March 4, 2006 || Kitt Peak || Spacewatch ||  || align=right data-sort-value="0.61" | 610 m || 
|-id=167 bgcolor=#E9E9E9
| 509167 ||  || — || March 5, 2006 || Kitt Peak || Spacewatch ||  || align=right data-sort-value="0.70" | 700 m || 
|-id=168 bgcolor=#E9E9E9
| 509168 ||  || — || March 23, 2006 || Kitt Peak || Spacewatch ||  || align=right | 1.5 km || 
|-id=169 bgcolor=#E9E9E9
| 509169 ||  || — || March 24, 2006 || Mount Lemmon || Mount Lemmon Survey ||  || align=right data-sort-value="0.70" | 700 m || 
|-id=170 bgcolor=#E9E9E9
| 509170 ||  || — || April 2, 2006 || Kitt Peak || Spacewatch ||  || align=right data-sort-value="0.91" | 910 m || 
|-id=171 bgcolor=#E9E9E9
| 509171 ||  || — || April 8, 2006 || Kitt Peak || Spacewatch ||  || align=right | 1.1 km || 
|-id=172 bgcolor=#E9E9E9
| 509172 ||  || — || April 20, 2006 || Kitt Peak || Spacewatch ||  || align=right | 2.3 km || 
|-id=173 bgcolor=#E9E9E9
| 509173 ||  || — || April 25, 2006 || Kitt Peak || Spacewatch || RAF || align=right data-sort-value="0.65" | 650 m || 
|-id=174 bgcolor=#E9E9E9
| 509174 ||  || — || April 24, 2006 || Kitt Peak || Spacewatch ||  || align=right data-sort-value="0.95" | 950 m || 
|-id=175 bgcolor=#E9E9E9
| 509175 ||  || — || April 25, 2006 || Kitt Peak || Spacewatch ||  || align=right data-sort-value="0.84" | 840 m || 
|-id=176 bgcolor=#E9E9E9
| 509176 ||  || — || April 25, 2006 || Kitt Peak || Spacewatch ||  || align=right data-sort-value="0.80" | 800 m || 
|-id=177 bgcolor=#E9E9E9
| 509177 ||  || — || April 26, 2006 || Kitt Peak || Spacewatch ||  || align=right | 1.5 km || 
|-id=178 bgcolor=#E9E9E9
| 509178 ||  || — || April 26, 2006 || Kitt Peak || Spacewatch ||  || align=right | 1.3 km || 
|-id=179 bgcolor=#E9E9E9
| 509179 ||  || — || April 26, 2006 || Catalina || CSS || BAR || align=right | 1.2 km || 
|-id=180 bgcolor=#fefefe
| 509180 ||  || — || April 20, 2006 || Kitt Peak || Spacewatch ||  || align=right data-sort-value="0.51" | 510 m || 
|-id=181 bgcolor=#E9E9E9
| 509181 ||  || — || May 1, 2006 || Kitt Peak || Spacewatch ||  || align=right | 1.6 km || 
|-id=182 bgcolor=#E9E9E9
| 509182 ||  || — || May 6, 2006 || Mount Lemmon || Mount Lemmon Survey ||  || align=right | 1.4 km || 
|-id=183 bgcolor=#E9E9E9
| 509183 ||  || — || May 7, 2006 || Mount Lemmon || Mount Lemmon Survey ||  || align=right | 1.3 km || 
|-id=184 bgcolor=#E9E9E9
| 509184 ||  || — || May 20, 2006 || Kitt Peak || Spacewatch ||  || align=right | 1.7 km || 
|-id=185 bgcolor=#E9E9E9
| 509185 ||  || — || May 21, 2006 || Mount Lemmon || Mount Lemmon Survey ||  || align=right | 1.5 km || 
|-id=186 bgcolor=#E9E9E9
| 509186 ||  || — || May 21, 2006 || Kitt Peak || Spacewatch ||  || align=right | 1.8 km || 
|-id=187 bgcolor=#E9E9E9
| 509187 ||  || — || May 21, 2006 || Kitt Peak || Spacewatch ||  || align=right | 1.2 km || 
|-id=188 bgcolor=#E9E9E9
| 509188 ||  || — || May 22, 2006 || Kitt Peak || Spacewatch ||  || align=right | 1.8 km || 
|-id=189 bgcolor=#E9E9E9
| 509189 ||  || — || May 22, 2006 || Kitt Peak || Spacewatch ||  || align=right | 1.5 km || 
|-id=190 bgcolor=#E9E9E9
| 509190 ||  || — || May 31, 2006 || Mount Lemmon || Mount Lemmon Survey ||  || align=right | 1.4 km || 
|-id=191 bgcolor=#FFC2E0
| 509191 ||  || — || July 21, 2006 || Catalina || CSS || APOPHA || align=right data-sort-value="0.51" | 510 m || 
|-id=192 bgcolor=#FFC2E0
| 509192 ||  || — || July 24, 2006 || Socorro || LINEAR || AMO || align=right data-sort-value="0.47" | 470 m || 
|-id=193 bgcolor=#FA8072
| 509193 ||  || — || July 21, 2006 || Socorro || LINEAR ||  || align=right data-sort-value="0.93" | 930 m || 
|-id=194 bgcolor=#d6d6d6
| 509194 ||  || — || August 28, 2006 || Catalina || CSS ||  || align=right | 2.7 km || 
|-id=195 bgcolor=#FA8072
| 509195 ||  || — || August 18, 2006 || Kitt Peak || Spacewatch || H || align=right data-sort-value="0.68" | 680 m || 
|-id=196 bgcolor=#fefefe
| 509196 ||  || — || August 19, 2006 || Kitt Peak || Spacewatch ||  || align=right data-sort-value="0.63" | 630 m || 
|-id=197 bgcolor=#E9E9E9
| 509197 ||  || — || August 29, 2006 || Kitt Peak || Spacewatch ||  || align=right | 2.5 km || 
|-id=198 bgcolor=#fefefe
| 509198 ||  || — || September 14, 2006 || Kitt Peak || Spacewatch ||  || align=right data-sort-value="0.68" | 680 m || 
|-id=199 bgcolor=#fefefe
| 509199 ||  || — || September 15, 2006 || Kitt Peak || Spacewatch ||  || align=right data-sort-value="0.59" | 590 m || 
|-id=200 bgcolor=#fefefe
| 509200 ||  || — || September 15, 2006 || Kitt Peak || Spacewatch ||  || align=right data-sort-value="0.65" | 650 m || 
|}

509201–509300 

|-bgcolor=#d6d6d6
| 509201 ||  || — || September 14, 2006 || Kitt Peak || Spacewatch ||  || align=right | 2.9 km || 
|-id=202 bgcolor=#fefefe
| 509202 ||  || — || August 29, 2006 || Anderson Mesa || LONEOS ||  || align=right data-sort-value="0.85" | 850 m || 
|-id=203 bgcolor=#d6d6d6
| 509203 ||  || — || September 15, 2006 || Apache Point || A. C. Becker ||  || align=right | 2.1 km || 
|-id=204 bgcolor=#d6d6d6
| 509204 ||  || — || September 17, 2006 || Catalina || CSS ||  || align=right | 3.7 km || 
|-id=205 bgcolor=#fefefe
| 509205 ||  || — || August 21, 2006 || Kitt Peak || Spacewatch ||  || align=right data-sort-value="0.72" | 720 m || 
|-id=206 bgcolor=#fefefe
| 509206 ||  || — || September 17, 2006 || Kitt Peak || Spacewatch ||  || align=right data-sort-value="0.61" | 610 m || 
|-id=207 bgcolor=#d6d6d6
| 509207 ||  || — || September 19, 2006 || Catalina || CSS ||  || align=right | 2.8 km || 
|-id=208 bgcolor=#fefefe
| 509208 ||  || — || September 19, 2006 || La Sagra || OAM Obs. || NYS || align=right data-sort-value="0.67" | 670 m || 
|-id=209 bgcolor=#fefefe
| 509209 ||  || — || September 18, 2006 || Kitt Peak || Spacewatch ||  || align=right data-sort-value="0.60" | 600 m || 
|-id=210 bgcolor=#d6d6d6
| 509210 ||  || — || September 21, 2006 || Anderson Mesa || LONEOS ||  || align=right | 2.5 km || 
|-id=211 bgcolor=#fefefe
| 509211 ||  || — || September 25, 2006 || Socorro || LINEAR ||  || align=right data-sort-value="0.60" | 600 m || 
|-id=212 bgcolor=#fefefe
| 509212 ||  || — || August 28, 2006 || Catalina || CSS ||  || align=right data-sort-value="0.71" | 710 m || 
|-id=213 bgcolor=#fefefe
| 509213 ||  || — || September 23, 2006 || Kitt Peak || Spacewatch ||  || align=right data-sort-value="0.57" | 570 m || 
|-id=214 bgcolor=#d6d6d6
| 509214 ||  || — || September 18, 2006 || Kitt Peak || Spacewatch ||  || align=right | 2.3 km || 
|-id=215 bgcolor=#d6d6d6
| 509215 ||  || — || September 17, 2006 || Kitt Peak || Spacewatch || KOR || align=right | 1.3 km || 
|-id=216 bgcolor=#fefefe
| 509216 ||  || — || September 26, 2006 || Mount Lemmon || Mount Lemmon Survey ||  || align=right data-sort-value="0.66" | 660 m || 
|-id=217 bgcolor=#fefefe
| 509217 ||  || — || September 18, 2006 || Kitt Peak || Spacewatch ||  || align=right data-sort-value="0.57" | 570 m || 
|-id=218 bgcolor=#d6d6d6
| 509218 ||  || — || August 18, 2006 || Kitt Peak || Spacewatch ||  || align=right | 2.2 km || 
|-id=219 bgcolor=#d6d6d6
| 509219 ||  || — || September 19, 2006 || Kitt Peak || Spacewatch ||  || align=right | 1.6 km || 
|-id=220 bgcolor=#fefefe
| 509220 ||  || — || September 26, 2006 || Mount Lemmon || Mount Lemmon Survey ||  || align=right data-sort-value="0.61" | 610 m || 
|-id=221 bgcolor=#fefefe
| 509221 ||  || — || September 18, 2006 || Anderson Mesa || LONEOS ||  || align=right data-sort-value="0.78" | 780 m || 
|-id=222 bgcolor=#fefefe
| 509222 ||  || — || September 17, 2006 || Kitt Peak || Spacewatch ||  || align=right data-sort-value="0.52" | 520 m || 
|-id=223 bgcolor=#fefefe
| 509223 ||  || — || September 17, 2006 || Kitt Peak || Spacewatch ||  || align=right data-sort-value="0.55" | 550 m || 
|-id=224 bgcolor=#d6d6d6
| 509224 ||  || — || September 27, 2006 || Kitt Peak || Spacewatch ||  || align=right | 1.7 km || 
|-id=225 bgcolor=#fefefe
| 509225 ||  || — || September 28, 2006 || Kitt Peak || Spacewatch || H || align=right data-sort-value="0.60" | 600 m || 
|-id=226 bgcolor=#fefefe
| 509226 ||  || — || September 28, 2006 || Kitt Peak || Spacewatch ||  || align=right data-sort-value="0.52" | 520 m || 
|-id=227 bgcolor=#d6d6d6
| 509227 ||  || — || September 16, 2006 || Apache Point || A. C. Becker ||  || align=right | 2.3 km || 
|-id=228 bgcolor=#fefefe
| 509228 ||  || — || September 17, 2006 || Kitt Peak || Spacewatch ||  || align=right data-sort-value="0.59" | 590 m || 
|-id=229 bgcolor=#fefefe
| 509229 ||  || — || September 30, 2006 || Kitt Peak || Spacewatch || ERI || align=right | 1.2 km || 
|-id=230 bgcolor=#fefefe
| 509230 ||  || — || September 18, 2006 || Catalina || CSS || V || align=right data-sort-value="0.68" | 680 m || 
|-id=231 bgcolor=#fefefe
| 509231 ||  || — || September 30, 2006 || Mount Lemmon || Mount Lemmon Survey ||  || align=right data-sort-value="0.79" | 790 m || 
|-id=232 bgcolor=#d6d6d6
| 509232 ||  || — || October 12, 2006 || Kitt Peak || Spacewatch ||  || align=right | 1.8 km || 
|-id=233 bgcolor=#d6d6d6
| 509233 ||  || — || September 26, 2006 || Mount Lemmon || Mount Lemmon Survey ||  || align=right | 2.1 km || 
|-id=234 bgcolor=#fefefe
| 509234 ||  || — || October 12, 2006 || Kitt Peak || Spacewatch ||  || align=right data-sort-value="0.43" | 430 m || 
|-id=235 bgcolor=#fefefe
| 509235 ||  || — || September 26, 2006 || Mount Lemmon || Mount Lemmon Survey ||  || align=right data-sort-value="0.53" | 530 m || 
|-id=236 bgcolor=#fefefe
| 509236 ||  || — || October 12, 2006 || Kitt Peak || Spacewatch || MAS || align=right data-sort-value="0.48" | 480 m || 
|-id=237 bgcolor=#fefefe
| 509237 ||  || — || October 2, 2006 || Mount Lemmon || Mount Lemmon Survey || H || align=right data-sort-value="0.59" | 590 m || 
|-id=238 bgcolor=#fefefe
| 509238 ||  || — || October 13, 2006 || Kitt Peak || Spacewatch ||  || align=right data-sort-value="0.54" | 540 m || 
|-id=239 bgcolor=#fefefe
| 509239 ||  || — || October 12, 2006 || Kitt Peak || Spacewatch ||  || align=right data-sort-value="0.74" | 740 m || 
|-id=240 bgcolor=#fefefe
| 509240 ||  || — || September 27, 2006 || Mount Lemmon || Mount Lemmon Survey || H || align=right data-sort-value="0.60" | 600 m || 
|-id=241 bgcolor=#fefefe
| 509241 ||  || — || October 13, 2006 || Kitt Peak || Spacewatch ||  || align=right data-sort-value="0.68" | 680 m || 
|-id=242 bgcolor=#fefefe
| 509242 ||  || — || October 2, 2006 || Mount Lemmon || Mount Lemmon Survey ||  || align=right data-sort-value="0.55" | 550 m || 
|-id=243 bgcolor=#fefefe
| 509243 ||  || — || October 2, 2006 || Mount Lemmon || Mount Lemmon Survey ||  || align=right data-sort-value="0.62" | 620 m || 
|-id=244 bgcolor=#fefefe
| 509244 ||  || — || September 30, 2006 || Mount Lemmon || Mount Lemmon Survey ||  || align=right data-sort-value="0.60" | 600 m || 
|-id=245 bgcolor=#fefefe
| 509245 ||  || — || October 3, 2006 || Mount Lemmon || Mount Lemmon Survey ||  || align=right data-sort-value="0.61" | 610 m || 
|-id=246 bgcolor=#d6d6d6
| 509246 ||  || — || October 2, 2006 || Mount Lemmon || Mount Lemmon Survey ||  || align=right | 2.6 km || 
|-id=247 bgcolor=#d6d6d6
| 509247 ||  || — || October 16, 2006 || Catalina || CSS ||  || align=right | 2.0 km || 
|-id=248 bgcolor=#fefefe
| 509248 ||  || — || October 16, 2006 || Kitt Peak || Spacewatch || MAS || align=right data-sort-value="0.45" | 450 m || 
|-id=249 bgcolor=#d6d6d6
| 509249 ||  || — || October 17, 2006 || Mount Lemmon || Mount Lemmon Survey ||  || align=right | 2.8 km || 
|-id=250 bgcolor=#d6d6d6
| 509250 ||  || — || September 19, 2006 || La Sagra || OAM Obs. ||  || align=right | 2.0 km || 
|-id=251 bgcolor=#fefefe
| 509251 ||  || — || March 13, 2005 || Kitt Peak || Spacewatch ||  || align=right data-sort-value="0.69" | 690 m || 
|-id=252 bgcolor=#fefefe
| 509252 ||  || — || September 26, 2006 || Mount Lemmon || Mount Lemmon Survey ||  || align=right data-sort-value="0.54" | 540 m || 
|-id=253 bgcolor=#d6d6d6
| 509253 ||  || — || October 16, 2006 || Kitt Peak || Spacewatch || THM || align=right | 1.7 km || 
|-id=254 bgcolor=#fefefe
| 509254 ||  || — || October 2, 2006 || Kitt Peak || Spacewatch ||  || align=right data-sort-value="0.76" | 760 m || 
|-id=255 bgcolor=#fefefe
| 509255 ||  || — || September 28, 2006 || Catalina || CSS ||  || align=right data-sort-value="0.73" | 730 m || 
|-id=256 bgcolor=#d6d6d6
| 509256 ||  || — || September 27, 2006 || Mount Lemmon || Mount Lemmon Survey ||  || align=right | 3.0 km || 
|-id=257 bgcolor=#fefefe
| 509257 ||  || — || October 2, 2006 || Mount Lemmon || Mount Lemmon Survey ||  || align=right data-sort-value="0.59" | 590 m || 
|-id=258 bgcolor=#d6d6d6
| 509258 ||  || — || September 30, 2006 || Mount Lemmon || Mount Lemmon Survey ||  || align=right | 2.3 km || 
|-id=259 bgcolor=#d6d6d6
| 509259 ||  || — || September 26, 2006 || Mount Lemmon || Mount Lemmon Survey ||  || align=right | 2.2 km || 
|-id=260 bgcolor=#fefefe
| 509260 ||  || — || September 30, 2006 || Mount Lemmon || Mount Lemmon Survey ||  || align=right data-sort-value="0.65" | 650 m || 
|-id=261 bgcolor=#d6d6d6
| 509261 ||  || — || October 13, 2006 || Kitt Peak || Spacewatch ||  || align=right | 1.8 km || 
|-id=262 bgcolor=#d6d6d6
| 509262 ||  || — || October 4, 2006 || Mount Lemmon || Mount Lemmon Survey ||  || align=right | 2.1 km || 
|-id=263 bgcolor=#d6d6d6
| 509263 ||  || — || October 2, 2006 || Mount Lemmon || Mount Lemmon Survey || KOR || align=right | 1.3 km || 
|-id=264 bgcolor=#fefefe
| 509264 ||  || — || October 2, 2006 || Mount Lemmon || Mount Lemmon Survey ||  || align=right data-sort-value="0.52" | 520 m || 
|-id=265 bgcolor=#d6d6d6
| 509265 ||  || — || September 14, 2006 || Kitt Peak || Spacewatch ||  || align=right | 2.1 km || 
|-id=266 bgcolor=#d6d6d6
| 509266 ||  || — || September 30, 2006 || Catalina || CSS ||  || align=right | 3.4 km || 
|-id=267 bgcolor=#d6d6d6
| 509267 ||  || — || October 20, 2006 || Kitt Peak || Spacewatch || KOR || align=right | 1.0 km || 
|-id=268 bgcolor=#d6d6d6
| 509268 ||  || — || October 19, 2006 || Mount Lemmon || Mount Lemmon Survey ||  || align=right | 2.4 km || 
|-id=269 bgcolor=#fefefe
| 509269 ||  || — || October 23, 2006 || Kitt Peak || Spacewatch ||  || align=right data-sort-value="0.57" | 570 m || 
|-id=270 bgcolor=#fefefe
| 509270 ||  || — || September 19, 2006 || Catalina || CSS || H || align=right data-sort-value="0.79" | 790 m || 
|-id=271 bgcolor=#d6d6d6
| 509271 ||  || — || October 21, 2006 || Palomar || NEAT ||  || align=right | 2.1 km || 
|-id=272 bgcolor=#fefefe
| 509272 ||  || — || October 15, 2006 || Kitt Peak || Spacewatch ||  || align=right data-sort-value="0.61" | 610 m || 
|-id=273 bgcolor=#fefefe
| 509273 ||  || — || October 27, 2006 || Mount Lemmon || Mount Lemmon Survey ||  || align=right data-sort-value="0.54" | 540 m || 
|-id=274 bgcolor=#d6d6d6
| 509274 ||  || — || September 28, 2006 || Mount Lemmon || Mount Lemmon Survey ||  || align=right | 1.8 km || 
|-id=275 bgcolor=#fefefe
| 509275 ||  || — || October 15, 2006 || Kitt Peak || Spacewatch ||  || align=right data-sort-value="0.60" | 600 m || 
|-id=276 bgcolor=#fefefe
| 509276 ||  || — || October 16, 2006 || Kitt Peak || Spacewatch ||  || align=right data-sort-value="0.49" | 490 m || 
|-id=277 bgcolor=#fefefe
| 509277 ||  || — || October 3, 2006 || Mount Lemmon || Mount Lemmon Survey ||  || align=right data-sort-value="0.68" | 680 m || 
|-id=278 bgcolor=#d6d6d6
| 509278 ||  || — || October 20, 2006 || Mount Lemmon || Mount Lemmon Survey ||  || align=right | 2.5 km || 
|-id=279 bgcolor=#fefefe
| 509279 ||  || — || October 2, 2006 || Mount Lemmon || Mount Lemmon Survey ||  || align=right data-sort-value="0.66" | 660 m || 
|-id=280 bgcolor=#FA8072
| 509280 ||  || — || September 30, 2006 || Catalina || CSS ||  || align=right data-sort-value="0.98" | 980 m || 
|-id=281 bgcolor=#d6d6d6
| 509281 ||  || — || September 27, 2006 || Mount Lemmon || Mount Lemmon Survey || EOS || align=right | 1.6 km || 
|-id=282 bgcolor=#fefefe
| 509282 ||  || — || November 14, 2006 || Socorro || LINEAR || H || align=right | 1.0 km || 
|-id=283 bgcolor=#fefefe
| 509283 ||  || — || September 27, 2006 || Mount Lemmon || Mount Lemmon Survey ||  || align=right data-sort-value="0.65" | 650 m || 
|-id=284 bgcolor=#fefefe
| 509284 ||  || — || November 10, 2006 || Kitt Peak || Spacewatch || H || align=right data-sort-value="0.57" | 570 m || 
|-id=285 bgcolor=#fefefe
| 509285 ||  || — || October 12, 2006 || Kitt Peak || Spacewatch ||  || align=right data-sort-value="0.53" | 530 m || 
|-id=286 bgcolor=#fefefe
| 509286 ||  || — || October 20, 2006 || Kitt Peak || Spacewatch ||  || align=right data-sort-value="0.57" | 570 m || 
|-id=287 bgcolor=#d6d6d6
| 509287 ||  || — || November 10, 2006 || Kitt Peak || Spacewatch ||  || align=right | 2.9 km || 
|-id=288 bgcolor=#d6d6d6
| 509288 ||  || — || November 10, 2006 || Kitt Peak || Spacewatch ||  || align=right | 2.1 km || 
|-id=289 bgcolor=#fefefe
| 509289 ||  || — || November 11, 2006 || Kitt Peak || Spacewatch ||  || align=right data-sort-value="0.49" | 490 m || 
|-id=290 bgcolor=#fefefe
| 509290 ||  || — || November 11, 2006 || Kitt Peak || Spacewatch || NYS || align=right data-sort-value="0.44" | 440 m || 
|-id=291 bgcolor=#d6d6d6
| 509291 ||  || — || October 22, 2006 || Mount Lemmon || Mount Lemmon Survey || EOS || align=right | 1.7 km || 
|-id=292 bgcolor=#fefefe
| 509292 ||  || — || October 30, 2006 || Mount Lemmon || Mount Lemmon Survey || H || align=right data-sort-value="0.55" | 550 m || 
|-id=293 bgcolor=#d6d6d6
| 509293 ||  || — || November 11, 2006 || Kitt Peak || Spacewatch || EOS || align=right | 1.6 km || 
|-id=294 bgcolor=#d6d6d6
| 509294 ||  || — || November 11, 2006 || Kitt Peak || Spacewatch ||  || align=right | 2.3 km || 
|-id=295 bgcolor=#fefefe
| 509295 ||  || — || November 11, 2006 || Kitt Peak || Spacewatch ||  || align=right data-sort-value="0.60" | 600 m || 
|-id=296 bgcolor=#d6d6d6
| 509296 ||  || — || October 31, 2006 || Mount Lemmon || Mount Lemmon Survey ||  || align=right | 2.6 km || 
|-id=297 bgcolor=#fefefe
| 509297 ||  || — || November 13, 2006 || Kitt Peak || Spacewatch || H || align=right data-sort-value="0.59" | 590 m || 
|-id=298 bgcolor=#fefefe
| 509298 ||  || — || September 27, 2006 || Mount Lemmon || Mount Lemmon Survey ||  || align=right data-sort-value="0.55" | 550 m || 
|-id=299 bgcolor=#d6d6d6
| 509299 ||  || — || September 27, 2006 || Mount Lemmon || Mount Lemmon Survey ||  || align=right | 2.1 km || 
|-id=300 bgcolor=#d6d6d6
| 509300 ||  || — || October 13, 2006 || Kitt Peak || Spacewatch || EOS || align=right | 1.3 km || 
|}

509301–509400 

|-bgcolor=#d6d6d6
| 509301 ||  || — || October 27, 2006 || Catalina || CSS ||  || align=right | 2.9 km || 
|-id=302 bgcolor=#d6d6d6
| 509302 ||  || — || October 21, 2006 || Mount Lemmon || Mount Lemmon Survey ||  || align=right | 2.1 km || 
|-id=303 bgcolor=#fefefe
| 509303 ||  || — || August 27, 2006 || Kitt Peak || Spacewatch ||  || align=right data-sort-value="0.61" | 610 m || 
|-id=304 bgcolor=#d6d6d6
| 509304 ||  || — || October 21, 2006 || Mount Lemmon || Mount Lemmon Survey ||  || align=right | 2.7 km || 
|-id=305 bgcolor=#fefefe
| 509305 ||  || — || October 16, 2006 || Catalina || CSS ||  || align=right data-sort-value="0.80" | 800 m || 
|-id=306 bgcolor=#fefefe
| 509306 ||  || — || October 4, 2006 || Mount Lemmon || Mount Lemmon Survey ||  || align=right data-sort-value="0.65" | 650 m || 
|-id=307 bgcolor=#d6d6d6
| 509307 ||  || — || October 2, 2006 || Kitt Peak || Spacewatch ||  || align=right | 2.1 km || 
|-id=308 bgcolor=#d6d6d6
| 509308 ||  || — || November 15, 2006 || Kitt Peak || Spacewatch || TEL || align=right data-sort-value="0.99" | 990 m || 
|-id=309 bgcolor=#d6d6d6
| 509309 ||  || — || November 16, 2006 || Kitt Peak || Spacewatch || Tj (2.91) || align=right | 3.1 km || 
|-id=310 bgcolor=#d6d6d6
| 509310 ||  || — || November 16, 2006 || Kitt Peak || Spacewatch ||  || align=right | 1.7 km || 
|-id=311 bgcolor=#fefefe
| 509311 ||  || — || November 16, 2006 || Mount Lemmon || Mount Lemmon Survey || NYS || align=right data-sort-value="0.52" | 520 m || 
|-id=312 bgcolor=#d6d6d6
| 509312 ||  || — || November 17, 2006 || Mount Lemmon || Mount Lemmon Survey ||  || align=right | 2.0 km || 
|-id=313 bgcolor=#fefefe
| 509313 ||  || — || November 17, 2006 || Mount Lemmon || Mount Lemmon Survey ||  || align=right data-sort-value="0.89" | 890 m || 
|-id=314 bgcolor=#d6d6d6
| 509314 ||  || — || October 19, 2006 || Mount Lemmon || Mount Lemmon Survey ||  || align=right | 2.5 km || 
|-id=315 bgcolor=#d6d6d6
| 509315 ||  || — || November 12, 2006 || Mount Lemmon || Mount Lemmon Survey ||  || align=right | 2.0 km || 
|-id=316 bgcolor=#fefefe
| 509316 ||  || — || October 23, 2006 || Mount Lemmon || Mount Lemmon Survey ||  || align=right data-sort-value="0.57" | 570 m || 
|-id=317 bgcolor=#d6d6d6
| 509317 ||  || — || September 28, 2006 || Mount Lemmon || Mount Lemmon Survey ||  || align=right | 1.7 km || 
|-id=318 bgcolor=#d6d6d6
| 509318 ||  || — || October 28, 2006 || Mount Lemmon || Mount Lemmon Survey ||  || align=right | 2.4 km || 
|-id=319 bgcolor=#fefefe
| 509319 ||  || — || October 29, 2006 || Mount Lemmon || Mount Lemmon Survey ||  || align=right data-sort-value="0.57" | 570 m || 
|-id=320 bgcolor=#fefefe
| 509320 ||  || — || September 27, 2006 || Mount Lemmon || Mount Lemmon Survey || MAS || align=right data-sort-value="0.49" | 490 m || 
|-id=321 bgcolor=#d6d6d6
| 509321 ||  || — || November 19, 2006 || Kitt Peak || Spacewatch ||  || align=right | 2.6 km || 
|-id=322 bgcolor=#fefefe
| 509322 ||  || — || November 19, 2006 || Kitt Peak || Spacewatch ||  || align=right data-sort-value="0.47" | 470 m || 
|-id=323 bgcolor=#fefefe
| 509323 ||  || — || November 19, 2006 || Kitt Peak || Spacewatch || NYS || align=right data-sort-value="0.60" | 600 m || 
|-id=324 bgcolor=#d6d6d6
| 509324 ||  || — || November 18, 2006 || Mount Lemmon || Mount Lemmon Survey ||  || align=right | 2.6 km || 
|-id=325 bgcolor=#fefefe
| 509325 ||  || — || October 31, 2006 || Mount Lemmon || Mount Lemmon Survey ||  || align=right data-sort-value="0.76" | 760 m || 
|-id=326 bgcolor=#fefefe
| 509326 ||  || — || September 27, 2006 || Mount Lemmon || Mount Lemmon Survey ||  || align=right data-sort-value="0.52" | 520 m || 
|-id=327 bgcolor=#d6d6d6
| 509327 ||  || — || November 11, 2006 || Mount Lemmon || Mount Lemmon Survey ||  || align=right | 2.3 km || 
|-id=328 bgcolor=#d6d6d6
| 509328 ||  || — || October 31, 2006 || Mount Lemmon || Mount Lemmon Survey ||  || align=right | 2.0 km || 
|-id=329 bgcolor=#d6d6d6
| 509329 ||  || — || November 24, 2006 || Mount Lemmon || Mount Lemmon Survey ||  || align=right | 2.0 km || 
|-id=330 bgcolor=#fefefe
| 509330 ||  || — || November 1, 2006 || Mount Lemmon || Mount Lemmon Survey || H || align=right data-sort-value="0.67" | 670 m || 
|-id=331 bgcolor=#fefefe
| 509331 ||  || — || November 11, 2006 || Kitt Peak || Spacewatch || NYS || align=right data-sort-value="0.44" | 440 m || 
|-id=332 bgcolor=#fefefe
| 509332 ||  || — || November 16, 2006 || Kitt Peak || Spacewatch ||  || align=right data-sort-value="0.46" | 460 m || 
|-id=333 bgcolor=#d6d6d6
| 509333 ||  || — || November 22, 2006 || Kitt Peak || Spacewatch ||  || align=right | 1.9 km || 
|-id=334 bgcolor=#d6d6d6
| 509334 ||  || — || November 11, 2006 || Kitt Peak || Spacewatch ||  || align=right | 2.1 km || 
|-id=335 bgcolor=#d6d6d6
| 509335 ||  || — || December 1, 2006 || Mount Lemmon || Mount Lemmon Survey ||  || align=right | 2.8 km || 
|-id=336 bgcolor=#fefefe
| 509336 ||  || — || November 19, 2006 || Kitt Peak || Spacewatch ||  || align=right data-sort-value="0.62" | 620 m || 
|-id=337 bgcolor=#fefefe
| 509337 ||  || — || November 16, 2006 || Catalina || CSS ||  || align=right data-sort-value="0.81" | 810 m || 
|-id=338 bgcolor=#d6d6d6
| 509338 ||  || — || December 12, 2006 || Mount Lemmon || Mount Lemmon Survey || VER || align=right | 2.4 km || 
|-id=339 bgcolor=#d6d6d6
| 509339 ||  || — || December 1, 2006 || Mount Lemmon || Mount Lemmon Survey ||  || align=right | 3.3 km || 
|-id=340 bgcolor=#fefefe
| 509340 ||  || — || November 18, 2006 || Mount Lemmon || Mount Lemmon Survey ||  || align=right data-sort-value="0.68" | 680 m || 
|-id=341 bgcolor=#d6d6d6
| 509341 ||  || — || December 21, 2006 || Mount Lemmon || Mount Lemmon Survey ||  || align=right | 3.3 km || 
|-id=342 bgcolor=#d6d6d6
| 509342 ||  || — || December 13, 2006 || Mount Lemmon || Mount Lemmon Survey ||  || align=right | 2.3 km || 
|-id=343 bgcolor=#fefefe
| 509343 ||  || — || December 13, 2006 || Kitt Peak || Spacewatch ||  || align=right data-sort-value="0.60" | 600 m || 
|-id=344 bgcolor=#d6d6d6
| 509344 ||  || — || November 21, 2006 || Mount Lemmon || Mount Lemmon Survey ||  || align=right | 2.3 km || 
|-id=345 bgcolor=#d6d6d6
| 509345 ||  || — || December 21, 2006 || Kitt Peak || Spacewatch ||  || align=right | 3.1 km || 
|-id=346 bgcolor=#fefefe
| 509346 ||  || — || November 22, 2006 || Mount Lemmon || Mount Lemmon Survey ||  || align=right data-sort-value="0.82" | 820 m || 
|-id=347 bgcolor=#fefefe
| 509347 ||  || — || November 25, 2006 || Mount Lemmon || Mount Lemmon Survey ||  || align=right data-sort-value="0.75" | 750 m || 
|-id=348 bgcolor=#d6d6d6
| 509348 ||  || — || August 28, 2005 || Kitt Peak || Spacewatch ||  || align=right | 2.2 km || 
|-id=349 bgcolor=#d6d6d6
| 509349 ||  || — || December 13, 2006 || Mount Lemmon || Mount Lemmon Survey ||  || align=right | 2.4 km || 
|-id=350 bgcolor=#d6d6d6
| 509350 ||  || — || December 24, 2006 || Kitt Peak || Spacewatch || Tj (2.98) || align=right | 2.7 km || 
|-id=351 bgcolor=#d6d6d6
| 509351 ||  || — || December 21, 2006 || Mount Lemmon || Mount Lemmon Survey ||  || align=right | 2.2 km || 
|-id=352 bgcolor=#FFC2E0
| 509352 ||  || — || January 8, 2007 || Mount Lemmon || Mount Lemmon Survey || ATEPHA || align=right data-sort-value="0.34" | 340 m || 
|-id=353 bgcolor=#FFC2E0
| 509353 ||  || — || January 10, 2007 || Socorro || LINEAR || AMO || align=right data-sort-value="0.43" | 430 m || 
|-id=354 bgcolor=#d6d6d6
| 509354 ||  || — || November 17, 2006 || Mount Lemmon || Mount Lemmon Survey ||  || align=right | 2.1 km || 
|-id=355 bgcolor=#fefefe
| 509355 ||  || — || December 21, 2006 || Mount Lemmon || Mount Lemmon Survey ||  || align=right data-sort-value="0.70" | 700 m || 
|-id=356 bgcolor=#fefefe
| 509356 ||  || — || December 13, 2006 || Mount Lemmon || Mount Lemmon Survey ||  || align=right data-sort-value="0.59" | 590 m || 
|-id=357 bgcolor=#d6d6d6
| 509357 ||  || — || January 13, 2007 || Vallemare Borbona || V. S. Casulli || LIX || align=right | 3.0 km || 
|-id=358 bgcolor=#fefefe
| 509358 ||  || — || November 27, 2006 || Mount Lemmon || Mount Lemmon Survey ||  || align=right data-sort-value="0.71" | 710 m || 
|-id=359 bgcolor=#fefefe
| 509359 ||  || — || January 9, 2007 || Mount Lemmon || Mount Lemmon Survey ||  || align=right data-sort-value="0.59" | 590 m || 
|-id=360 bgcolor=#d6d6d6
| 509360 ||  || — || January 10, 2007 || Mount Lemmon || Mount Lemmon Survey ||  || align=right | 2.2 km || 
|-id=361 bgcolor=#d6d6d6
| 509361 ||  || — || January 10, 2007 || Mount Lemmon || Mount Lemmon Survey ||  || align=right | 2.5 km || 
|-id=362 bgcolor=#d6d6d6
| 509362 ||  || — || January 17, 2007 || Kitt Peak || Spacewatch ||  || align=right | 2.2 km || 
|-id=363 bgcolor=#fefefe
| 509363 ||  || — || January 23, 2007 || Bergisch Gladbach || W. Bickel || NYS || align=right data-sort-value="0.78" | 780 m || 
|-id=364 bgcolor=#fefefe
| 509364 ||  || — || January 10, 2007 || Kitt Peak || Spacewatch ||  || align=right data-sort-value="0.65" | 650 m || 
|-id=365 bgcolor=#fefefe
| 509365 ||  || — || January 17, 2007 || Kitt Peak || Spacewatch ||  || align=right data-sort-value="0.68" | 680 m || 
|-id=366 bgcolor=#fefefe
| 509366 ||  || — || November 27, 2006 || Mount Lemmon || Mount Lemmon Survey ||  || align=right data-sort-value="0.64" | 640 m || 
|-id=367 bgcolor=#fefefe
| 509367 ||  || — || January 24, 2007 || Socorro || LINEAR || H || align=right data-sort-value="0.56" | 560 m || 
|-id=368 bgcolor=#fefefe
| 509368 ||  || — || January 24, 2007 || Mount Lemmon || Mount Lemmon Survey || NYS || align=right data-sort-value="0.56" | 560 m || 
|-id=369 bgcolor=#d6d6d6
| 509369 ||  || — || January 24, 2007 || Mount Lemmon || Mount Lemmon Survey ||  || align=right | 2.8 km || 
|-id=370 bgcolor=#d6d6d6
| 509370 ||  || — || December 14, 2006 || Mount Lemmon || Mount Lemmon Survey ||  || align=right | 2.2 km || 
|-id=371 bgcolor=#fefefe
| 509371 ||  || — || January 26, 2007 || Kitt Peak || Spacewatch || MAS || align=right data-sort-value="0.68" | 680 m || 
|-id=372 bgcolor=#fefefe
| 509372 ||  || — || January 27, 2007 || Mount Lemmon || Mount Lemmon Survey ||  || align=right data-sort-value="0.65" | 650 m || 
|-id=373 bgcolor=#fefefe
| 509373 ||  || — || January 27, 2007 || Mount Lemmon || Mount Lemmon Survey ||  || align=right | 1.0 km || 
|-id=374 bgcolor=#d6d6d6
| 509374 ||  || — || January 27, 2007 || Mount Lemmon || Mount Lemmon Survey || TIR || align=right | 2.9 km || 
|-id=375 bgcolor=#d6d6d6
| 509375 ||  || — || January 28, 2007 || Mount Lemmon || Mount Lemmon Survey ||  || align=right | 2.3 km || 
|-id=376 bgcolor=#fefefe
| 509376 ||  || — || January 16, 2007 || Catalina || CSS || H || align=right data-sort-value="0.68" | 680 m || 
|-id=377 bgcolor=#fefefe
| 509377 ||  || — || January 27, 2007 || Kitt Peak || Spacewatch || MAS || align=right data-sort-value="0.61" | 610 m || 
|-id=378 bgcolor=#fefefe
| 509378 ||  || — || January 27, 2007 || Kitt Peak || Spacewatch || NYS || align=right data-sort-value="0.58" | 580 m || 
|-id=379 bgcolor=#fefefe
| 509379 ||  || — || January 27, 2007 || Kitt Peak || Spacewatch || NYS || align=right data-sort-value="0.54" | 540 m || 
|-id=380 bgcolor=#d6d6d6
| 509380 ||  || — || January 19, 2007 || Mauna Kea || Mauna Kea Obs. || THM || align=right | 1.9 km || 
|-id=381 bgcolor=#d6d6d6
| 509381 ||  || — || November 27, 2006 || Mount Lemmon || Mount Lemmon Survey ||  || align=right | 2.4 km || 
|-id=382 bgcolor=#d6d6d6
| 509382 ||  || — || February 6, 2007 || Kitt Peak || Spacewatch || LIX || align=right | 2.7 km || 
|-id=383 bgcolor=#fefefe
| 509383 ||  || — || February 6, 2007 || Kitt Peak || Spacewatch ||  || align=right data-sort-value="0.79" | 790 m || 
|-id=384 bgcolor=#d6d6d6
| 509384 ||  || — || December 24, 2006 || Kitt Peak || Spacewatch ||  || align=right | 1.9 km || 
|-id=385 bgcolor=#d6d6d6
| 509385 ||  || — || January 27, 2007 || Kitt Peak || Spacewatch ||  || align=right | 3.3 km || 
|-id=386 bgcolor=#d6d6d6
| 509386 ||  || — || December 14, 2006 || Kitt Peak || Spacewatch ||  || align=right | 2.2 km || 
|-id=387 bgcolor=#fefefe
| 509387 ||  || — || February 7, 2007 || Palomar || NEAT || H || align=right data-sort-value="0.65" | 650 m || 
|-id=388 bgcolor=#d6d6d6
| 509388 ||  || — || December 21, 2006 || Mount Lemmon || Mount Lemmon Survey ||  || align=right | 3.5 km || 
|-id=389 bgcolor=#d6d6d6
| 509389 ||  || — || January 17, 2007 || Kitt Peak || Spacewatch ||  || align=right | 3.5 km || 
|-id=390 bgcolor=#fefefe
| 509390 ||  || — || January 10, 2007 || Mount Lemmon || Mount Lemmon Survey || NYS || align=right data-sort-value="0.58" | 580 m || 
|-id=391 bgcolor=#fefefe
| 509391 ||  || — || January 27, 2007 || Mount Lemmon || Mount Lemmon Survey || MAS || align=right data-sort-value="0.62" | 620 m || 
|-id=392 bgcolor=#d6d6d6
| 509392 ||  || — || November 27, 2006 || Mount Lemmon || Mount Lemmon Survey ||  || align=right | 3.1 km || 
|-id=393 bgcolor=#d6d6d6
| 509393 ||  || — || January 28, 2007 || Kitt Peak || Spacewatch ||  || align=right | 3.2 km || 
|-id=394 bgcolor=#fefefe
| 509394 ||  || — || February 10, 2007 || Catalina || CSS ||  || align=right data-sort-value="0.71" | 710 m || 
|-id=395 bgcolor=#fefefe
| 509395 ||  || — || February 17, 2007 || Kitt Peak || Spacewatch ||  || align=right data-sort-value="0.82" | 820 m || 
|-id=396 bgcolor=#d6d6d6
| 509396 ||  || — || February 17, 2007 || Kitt Peak || Spacewatch ||  || align=right | 2.6 km || 
|-id=397 bgcolor=#d6d6d6
| 509397 ||  || — || February 17, 2007 || Kitt Peak || Spacewatch ||  || align=right | 2.9 km || 
|-id=398 bgcolor=#fefefe
| 509398 ||  || — || January 28, 2007 || Mount Lemmon || Mount Lemmon Survey ||  || align=right data-sort-value="0.59" | 590 m || 
|-id=399 bgcolor=#d6d6d6
| 509399 ||  || — || February 17, 2007 || Kitt Peak || Spacewatch ||  || align=right | 3.0 km || 
|-id=400 bgcolor=#fefefe
| 509400 ||  || — || February 17, 2007 || Kitt Peak || Spacewatch || NYS || align=right data-sort-value="0.65" | 650 m || 
|}

509401–509500 

|-bgcolor=#fefefe
| 509401 ||  || — || February 17, 2007 || Kitt Peak || Spacewatch || MAS || align=right data-sort-value="0.75" | 750 m || 
|-id=402 bgcolor=#d6d6d6
| 509402 ||  || — || February 17, 2007 || Kitt Peak || Spacewatch ||  || align=right | 2.7 km || 
|-id=403 bgcolor=#fefefe
| 509403 ||  || — || February 21, 2007 || Kitt Peak || Spacewatch ||  || align=right data-sort-value="0.75" | 750 m || 
|-id=404 bgcolor=#d6d6d6
| 509404 ||  || — || January 17, 2007 || Kitt Peak || Spacewatch ||  || align=right | 3.2 km || 
|-id=405 bgcolor=#fefefe
| 509405 ||  || — || February 21, 2007 || Mount Lemmon || Mount Lemmon Survey ||  || align=right data-sort-value="0.76" | 760 m || 
|-id=406 bgcolor=#fefefe
| 509406 ||  || — || February 23, 2007 || Kitt Peak || Spacewatch ||  || align=right data-sort-value="0.71" | 710 m || 
|-id=407 bgcolor=#fefefe
| 509407 ||  || — || February 23, 2007 || Mount Lemmon || Mount Lemmon Survey ||  || align=right data-sort-value="0.86" | 860 m || 
|-id=408 bgcolor=#d6d6d6
| 509408 ||  || — || February 23, 2007 || Socorro || LINEAR ||  || align=right | 3.5 km || 
|-id=409 bgcolor=#C2FFFF
| 509409 ||  || — || February 23, 2007 || Kitt Peak || Spacewatch || L5 || align=right | 13 km || 
|-id=410 bgcolor=#d6d6d6
| 509410 ||  || — || February 8, 2007 || Mount Lemmon || Mount Lemmon Survey || HYG || align=right | 2.5 km || 
|-id=411 bgcolor=#d6d6d6
| 509411 ||  || — || February 23, 2007 || Mount Lemmon || Mount Lemmon Survey ||  || align=right | 2.7 km || 
|-id=412 bgcolor=#fefefe
| 509412 ||  || — || February 26, 2007 || Mount Lemmon || Mount Lemmon Survey || NYS || align=right data-sort-value="0.66" | 660 m || 
|-id=413 bgcolor=#fefefe
| 509413 ||  || — || March 9, 2007 || Catalina || CSS || NYS || align=right data-sort-value="0.73" | 730 m || 
|-id=414 bgcolor=#fefefe
| 509414 ||  || — || March 9, 2007 || Mount Lemmon || Mount Lemmon Survey || NYS || align=right data-sort-value="0.57" | 570 m || 
|-id=415 bgcolor=#fefefe
| 509415 ||  || — || February 21, 2007 || Mount Lemmon || Mount Lemmon Survey || NYS || align=right data-sort-value="0.63" | 630 m || 
|-id=416 bgcolor=#d6d6d6
| 509416 ||  || — || January 28, 2007 || Kitt Peak || Spacewatch ||  || align=right | 3.1 km || 
|-id=417 bgcolor=#fefefe
| 509417 ||  || — || March 11, 2007 || Kitt Peak || Spacewatch ||  || align=right data-sort-value="0.90" | 900 m || 
|-id=418 bgcolor=#d6d6d6
| 509418 ||  || — || March 9, 2007 || Mount Lemmon || Mount Lemmon Survey || THM || align=right | 2.3 km || 
|-id=419 bgcolor=#fefefe
| 509419 ||  || — || March 9, 2007 || Mount Lemmon || Mount Lemmon Survey || MAS || align=right data-sort-value="0.65" | 650 m || 
|-id=420 bgcolor=#fefefe
| 509420 ||  || — || March 9, 2007 || Mount Lemmon || Mount Lemmon Survey ||  || align=right data-sort-value="0.63" | 630 m || 
|-id=421 bgcolor=#fefefe
| 509421 ||  || — || March 9, 2007 || Kitt Peak || Spacewatch ||  || align=right data-sort-value="0.89" | 890 m || 
|-id=422 bgcolor=#d6d6d6
| 509422 ||  || — || March 10, 2007 || Mount Lemmon || Mount Lemmon Survey ||  || align=right | 2.3 km || 
|-id=423 bgcolor=#fefefe
| 509423 ||  || — || March 10, 2007 || Kitt Peak || Spacewatch || MAS || align=right data-sort-value="0.62" | 620 m || 
|-id=424 bgcolor=#fefefe
| 509424 ||  || — || March 11, 2007 || Kitt Peak || Spacewatch || H || align=right data-sort-value="0.64" | 640 m || 
|-id=425 bgcolor=#fefefe
| 509425 ||  || — || March 10, 2007 || Kitt Peak || Spacewatch ||  || align=right data-sort-value="0.68" | 680 m || 
|-id=426 bgcolor=#fefefe
| 509426 ||  || — || March 10, 2007 || Kitt Peak || Spacewatch || NYS || align=right data-sort-value="0.62" | 620 m || 
|-id=427 bgcolor=#fefefe
| 509427 ||  || — || April 11, 1996 || Kitt Peak || Spacewatch || NYS || align=right data-sort-value="0.55" | 550 m || 
|-id=428 bgcolor=#fefefe
| 509428 ||  || — || March 10, 2007 || Mount Lemmon || Mount Lemmon Survey ||  || align=right data-sort-value="0.52" | 520 m || 
|-id=429 bgcolor=#fefefe
| 509429 ||  || — || February 26, 2007 || Mount Lemmon || Mount Lemmon Survey || NYS || align=right data-sort-value="0.66" | 660 m || 
|-id=430 bgcolor=#fefefe
| 509430 ||  || — || March 11, 2007 || Mount Lemmon || Mount Lemmon Survey || MAS || align=right data-sort-value="0.68" | 680 m || 
|-id=431 bgcolor=#fefefe
| 509431 ||  || — || March 11, 2007 || Kitt Peak || Spacewatch || NYS || align=right data-sort-value="0.66" | 660 m || 
|-id=432 bgcolor=#fefefe
| 509432 ||  || — || March 9, 2007 || Mount Lemmon || Mount Lemmon Survey ||  || align=right data-sort-value="0.62" | 620 m || 
|-id=433 bgcolor=#fefefe
| 509433 ||  || — || March 12, 2007 || Kitt Peak || Spacewatch ||  || align=right data-sort-value="0.64" | 640 m || 
|-id=434 bgcolor=#d6d6d6
| 509434 ||  || — || February 26, 2007 || Mount Lemmon || Mount Lemmon Survey ||  || align=right | 3.1 km || 
|-id=435 bgcolor=#d6d6d6
| 509435 ||  || — || February 26, 2007 || Mount Lemmon || Mount Lemmon Survey ||  || align=right | 2.3 km || 
|-id=436 bgcolor=#d6d6d6
| 509436 ||  || — || March 12, 2007 || Kitt Peak || Spacewatch ||  || align=right | 2.6 km || 
|-id=437 bgcolor=#fefefe
| 509437 ||  || — || February 23, 2007 || Kitt Peak || Spacewatch || NYS || align=right data-sort-value="0.63" | 630 m || 
|-id=438 bgcolor=#fefefe
| 509438 ||  || — || January 17, 2007 || Mount Lemmon || Mount Lemmon Survey ||  || align=right | 1.1 km || 
|-id=439 bgcolor=#fefefe
| 509439 ||  || — || March 15, 2007 || Kitt Peak || Spacewatch ||  || align=right data-sort-value="0.75" | 750 m || 
|-id=440 bgcolor=#fefefe
| 509440 ||  || — || March 15, 2007 || Kitt Peak || Spacewatch || NYS || align=right data-sort-value="0.55" | 550 m || 
|-id=441 bgcolor=#fefefe
| 509441 ||  || — || March 9, 2007 || Kitt Peak || Spacewatch || NYS || align=right data-sort-value="0.67" | 670 m || 
|-id=442 bgcolor=#fefefe
| 509442 ||  || — || March 9, 2007 || Kitt Peak || Spacewatch ||  || align=right data-sort-value="0.70" | 700 m || 
|-id=443 bgcolor=#d6d6d6
| 509443 ||  || — || March 20, 2007 || Mount Lemmon || Mount Lemmon Survey ||  || align=right | 2.5 km || 
|-id=444 bgcolor=#d6d6d6
| 509444 ||  || — || April 11, 2007 || Kitt Peak || Spacewatch || THB || align=right | 2.5 km || 
|-id=445 bgcolor=#fefefe
| 509445 ||  || — || April 14, 2007 || Kitt Peak || Spacewatch ||  || align=right data-sort-value="0.71" | 710 m || 
|-id=446 bgcolor=#fefefe
| 509446 ||  || — || March 15, 2007 || Mount Lemmon || Mount Lemmon Survey ||  || align=right data-sort-value="0.82" | 820 m || 
|-id=447 bgcolor=#fefefe
| 509447 ||  || — || March 16, 2007 || Catalina || CSS ||  || align=right data-sort-value="0.97" | 970 m || 
|-id=448 bgcolor=#fefefe
| 509448 ||  || — || April 11, 2007 || Kitt Peak || Spacewatch ||  || align=right data-sort-value="0.72" | 720 m || 
|-id=449 bgcolor=#fefefe
| 509449 ||  || — || March 17, 2007 || Kitt Peak || Spacewatch ||  || align=right data-sort-value="0.78" | 780 m || 
|-id=450 bgcolor=#fefefe
| 509450 ||  || — || March 13, 2007 || Mount Lemmon || Mount Lemmon Survey ||  || align=right data-sort-value="0.82" | 820 m || 
|-id=451 bgcolor=#fefefe
| 509451 ||  || — || April 19, 2007 || Kitt Peak || Spacewatch || NYS || align=right data-sort-value="0.57" | 570 m || 
|-id=452 bgcolor=#fefefe
| 509452 ||  || — || April 22, 2007 || Mount Lemmon || Mount Lemmon Survey ||  || align=right data-sort-value="0.68" | 680 m || 
|-id=453 bgcolor=#fefefe
| 509453 ||  || — || April 14, 2007 || Kitt Peak || Spacewatch ||  || align=right data-sort-value="0.91" | 910 m || 
|-id=454 bgcolor=#fefefe
| 509454 ||  || — || April 24, 2007 || Kitt Peak || Spacewatch ||  || align=right data-sort-value="0.80" | 800 m || 
|-id=455 bgcolor=#fefefe
| 509455 ||  || — || April 11, 2007 || Kitt Peak || Spacewatch ||  || align=right data-sort-value="0.78" | 780 m || 
|-id=456 bgcolor=#FFC2E0
| 509456 ||  || — || June 7, 2007 || Catalina || CSS || APOPHAcritical || align=right data-sort-value="0.28" | 280 m || 
|-id=457 bgcolor=#E9E9E9
| 509457 ||  || — || April 15, 2007 || Mount Lemmon || Mount Lemmon Survey ||  || align=right | 2.1 km || 
|-id=458 bgcolor=#fefefe
| 509458 ||  || — || June 13, 2007 || Kitt Peak || Spacewatch ||  || align=right | 1.1 km || 
|-id=459 bgcolor=#d6d6d6
| 509459 ||  || — || June 15, 2007 || Kitt Peak || Spacewatch || Tj (2.97) || align=right | 5.8 km || 
|-id=460 bgcolor=#E9E9E9
| 509460 ||  || — || September 9, 2007 || Kitt Peak || Spacewatch ||  || align=right | 1.3 km || 
|-id=461 bgcolor=#E9E9E9
| 509461 ||  || — || September 11, 2007 || Catalina || CSS ||  || align=right | 2.3 km || 
|-id=462 bgcolor=#E9E9E9
| 509462 ||  || — || September 11, 2007 || Kitt Peak || Spacewatch ||  || align=right | 1.8 km || 
|-id=463 bgcolor=#fefefe
| 509463 ||  || — || September 11, 2007 || Kitt Peak || Spacewatch ||  || align=right data-sort-value="0.61" | 610 m || 
|-id=464 bgcolor=#E9E9E9
| 509464 ||  || — || September 12, 2007 || Mount Lemmon || Mount Lemmon Survey ||  || align=right | 2.1 km || 
|-id=465 bgcolor=#fefefe
| 509465 ||  || — || September 2, 2007 || Catalina || CSS ||  || align=right data-sort-value="0.67" | 670 m || 
|-id=466 bgcolor=#E9E9E9
| 509466 ||  || — || September 10, 2007 || Kitt Peak || Spacewatch ||  || align=right | 1.2 km || 
|-id=467 bgcolor=#E9E9E9
| 509467 ||  || — || August 24, 2007 || Kitt Peak || Spacewatch ||  || align=right | 1.8 km || 
|-id=468 bgcolor=#E9E9E9
| 509468 ||  || — || September 10, 2007 || Mount Lemmon || Mount Lemmon Survey || AGN || align=right | 1.0 km || 
|-id=469 bgcolor=#E9E9E9
| 509469 ||  || — || September 12, 2007 || Mount Lemmon || Mount Lemmon Survey ||  || align=right | 1.7 km || 
|-id=470 bgcolor=#fefefe
| 509470 ||  || — || September 13, 2007 || Mount Lemmon || Mount Lemmon Survey ||  || align=right data-sort-value="0.64" | 640 m || 
|-id=471 bgcolor=#E9E9E9
| 509471 ||  || — || September 15, 2007 || Mount Lemmon || Mount Lemmon Survey ||  || align=right | 1.5 km || 
|-id=472 bgcolor=#d6d6d6
| 509472 ||  || — || September 5, 2007 || Catalina || CSS || 3:2 || align=right | 5.6 km || 
|-id=473 bgcolor=#E9E9E9
| 509473 ||  || — || September 3, 2007 || Catalina || CSS || DOR || align=right | 2.4 km || 
|-id=474 bgcolor=#E9E9E9
| 509474 ||  || — || September 14, 2007 || Kitt Peak || Spacewatch ||  || align=right | 1.7 km || 
|-id=475 bgcolor=#E9E9E9
| 509475 ||  || — || September 14, 2007 || Mount Lemmon || Mount Lemmon Survey ||  || align=right | 2.0 km || 
|-id=476 bgcolor=#E9E9E9
| 509476 ||  || — || September 11, 2007 || Kitt Peak || Spacewatch ||  || align=right | 1.8 km || 
|-id=477 bgcolor=#d6d6d6
| 509477 ||  || — || September 18, 2007 || Kitt Peak || Spacewatch ||  || align=right | 1.9 km || 
|-id=478 bgcolor=#E9E9E9
| 509478 ||  || — || September 18, 2007 || Catalina || CSS ||  || align=right | 1.5 km || 
|-id=479 bgcolor=#E9E9E9
| 509479 ||  || — || October 7, 2007 || La Sagra || OAM Obs. ||  || align=right | 2.7 km || 
|-id=480 bgcolor=#E9E9E9
| 509480 ||  || — || September 10, 2007 || Mount Lemmon || Mount Lemmon Survey ||  || align=right | 1.6 km || 
|-id=481 bgcolor=#fefefe
| 509481 ||  || — || October 8, 2007 || Mount Lemmon || Mount Lemmon Survey ||  || align=right data-sort-value="0.50" | 500 m || 
|-id=482 bgcolor=#E9E9E9
| 509482 ||  || — || October 7, 2007 || Mount Lemmon || Mount Lemmon Survey ||  || align=right | 1.7 km || 
|-id=483 bgcolor=#E9E9E9
| 509483 ||  || — || October 6, 2007 || Socorro || LINEAR ||  || align=right | 1.2 km || 
|-id=484 bgcolor=#fefefe
| 509484 ||  || — || October 6, 2007 || Socorro || LINEAR ||  || align=right data-sort-value="0.64" | 640 m || 
|-id=485 bgcolor=#E9E9E9
| 509485 ||  || — || August 23, 2007 || Kitt Peak || Spacewatch ||  || align=right | 2.1 km || 
|-id=486 bgcolor=#E9E9E9
| 509486 ||  || — || October 9, 2007 || Mount Lemmon || Mount Lemmon Survey ||  || align=right | 1.8 km || 
|-id=487 bgcolor=#d6d6d6
| 509487 ||  || — || October 9, 2007 || Catalina || CSS ||  || align=right | 3.0 km || 
|-id=488 bgcolor=#E9E9E9
| 509488 ||  || — || October 10, 2007 || Kitt Peak || Spacewatch ||  || align=right | 2.3 km || 
|-id=489 bgcolor=#E9E9E9
| 509489 ||  || — || October 9, 2007 || Kitt Peak || Spacewatch ||  || align=right | 1.6 km || 
|-id=490 bgcolor=#E9E9E9
| 509490 ||  || — || October 11, 2007 || Kitt Peak || Spacewatch || GEF || align=right | 1.7 km || 
|-id=491 bgcolor=#E9E9E9
| 509491 ||  || — || September 10, 2007 || Mount Lemmon || Mount Lemmon Survey ||  || align=right | 1.7 km || 
|-id=492 bgcolor=#E9E9E9
| 509492 ||  || — || October 10, 2007 || Mount Lemmon || Mount Lemmon Survey || HOF || align=right | 2.7 km || 
|-id=493 bgcolor=#E9E9E9
| 509493 ||  || — || October 13, 2007 || Catalina || CSS ||  || align=right | 1.6 km || 
|-id=494 bgcolor=#d6d6d6
| 509494 ||  || — || October 11, 2007 || Catalina || CSS ||  || align=right | 2.7 km || 
|-id=495 bgcolor=#fefefe
| 509495 ||  || — || October 12, 2007 || Kitt Peak || Spacewatch ||  || align=right data-sort-value="0.41" | 410 m || 
|-id=496 bgcolor=#E9E9E9
| 509496 ||  || — || October 9, 2007 || Mount Lemmon || Mount Lemmon Survey ||  || align=right | 1.5 km || 
|-id=497 bgcolor=#E9E9E9
| 509497 ||  || — || October 9, 2007 || Mount Lemmon || Mount Lemmon Survey ||  || align=right | 1.7 km || 
|-id=498 bgcolor=#fefefe
| 509498 ||  || — || October 8, 2007 || Catalina || CSS ||  || align=right data-sort-value="0.67" | 670 m || 
|-id=499 bgcolor=#E9E9E9
| 509499 ||  || — || October 7, 2007 || Mount Lemmon || Mount Lemmon Survey ||  || align=right | 2.1 km || 
|-id=500 bgcolor=#fefefe
| 509500 ||  || — || October 8, 2007 || Mount Lemmon || Mount Lemmon Survey ||  || align=right data-sort-value="0.53" | 530 m || 
|}

509501–509600 

|-bgcolor=#E9E9E9
| 509501 ||  || — || October 24, 2007 || Mount Lemmon || Mount Lemmon Survey ||  || align=right | 2.1 km || 
|-id=502 bgcolor=#E9E9E9
| 509502 ||  || — || October 31, 2007 || Mount Lemmon || Mount Lemmon Survey || AGN || align=right | 1.1 km || 
|-id=503 bgcolor=#E9E9E9
| 509503 ||  || — || October 8, 2007 || Kitt Peak || Spacewatch ||  || align=right | 2.0 km || 
|-id=504 bgcolor=#E9E9E9
| 509504 ||  || — || October 30, 2007 || Kitt Peak || Spacewatch || HOF || align=right | 2.1 km || 
|-id=505 bgcolor=#FFC2E0
| 509505 ||  || — || November 5, 2007 || Catalina || CSS || ATE || align=right data-sort-value="0.20" | 200 m || 
|-id=506 bgcolor=#fefefe
| 509506 ||  || — || November 5, 2007 || XuYi || PMO NEO ||  || align=right data-sort-value="0.60" | 600 m || 
|-id=507 bgcolor=#E9E9E9
| 509507 ||  || — || November 2, 2007 || Kitt Peak || Spacewatch ||  || align=right | 1.8 km || 
|-id=508 bgcolor=#E9E9E9
| 509508 ||  || — || November 1, 2007 || Kitt Peak || Spacewatch ||  || align=right | 1.8 km || 
|-id=509 bgcolor=#fefefe
| 509509 ||  || — || November 1, 2007 || Kitt Peak || Spacewatch ||  || align=right data-sort-value="0.56" | 560 m || 
|-id=510 bgcolor=#fefefe
| 509510 ||  || — || November 5, 2007 || Kitt Peak || Spacewatch ||  || align=right data-sort-value="0.55" | 550 m || 
|-id=511 bgcolor=#d6d6d6
| 509511 ||  || — || October 20, 2007 || Mount Lemmon || Mount Lemmon Survey ||  || align=right | 1.9 km || 
|-id=512 bgcolor=#E9E9E9
| 509512 ||  || — || November 5, 2007 || Kitt Peak || Spacewatch || GEF || align=right | 1.3 km || 
|-id=513 bgcolor=#d6d6d6
| 509513 ||  || — || November 5, 2007 || Kitt Peak || Spacewatch || KOR || align=right | 1.3 km || 
|-id=514 bgcolor=#d6d6d6
| 509514 ||  || — || November 5, 2007 || Purple Mountain || PMO NEO ||  || align=right | 1.8 km || 
|-id=515 bgcolor=#d6d6d6
| 509515 ||  || — || November 13, 2007 || Mount Lemmon || Mount Lemmon Survey ||  || align=right | 2.3 km || 
|-id=516 bgcolor=#fefefe
| 509516 ||  || — || November 2, 2007 || Kitt Peak || Spacewatch ||  || align=right data-sort-value="0.62" | 620 m || 
|-id=517 bgcolor=#fefefe
| 509517 ||  || — || November 8, 2007 || Kitt Peak || Spacewatch ||  || align=right data-sort-value="0.52" | 520 m || 
|-id=518 bgcolor=#fefefe
| 509518 ||  || — || November 9, 2007 || Mount Lemmon || Mount Lemmon Survey ||  || align=right data-sort-value="0.58" | 580 m || 
|-id=519 bgcolor=#fefefe
| 509519 ||  || — || November 4, 2007 || Kitt Peak || Spacewatch ||  || align=right data-sort-value="0.62" | 620 m || 
|-id=520 bgcolor=#FFC2E0
| 509520 ||  || — || November 16, 2007 || Catalina || CSS || APO || align=right data-sort-value="0.59" | 590 m || 
|-id=521 bgcolor=#E9E9E9
| 509521 ||  || — || November 3, 2007 || Kitt Peak || Spacewatch || HOF || align=right | 2.3 km || 
|-id=522 bgcolor=#E9E9E9
| 509522 ||  || — || October 10, 2007 || Mount Lemmon || Mount Lemmon Survey ||  || align=right | 1.9 km || 
|-id=523 bgcolor=#FFC2E0
| 509523 ||  || — || December 4, 2007 || Socorro || LINEAR || APOcritical || align=right data-sort-value="0.49" | 490 m || 
|-id=524 bgcolor=#E9E9E9
| 509524 ||  || — || November 8, 2007 || Mount Lemmon || Mount Lemmon Survey ||  || align=right | 3.0 km || 
|-id=525 bgcolor=#fefefe
| 509525 ||  || — || November 9, 2007 || Socorro || LINEAR || H || align=right data-sort-value="0.77" | 770 m || 
|-id=526 bgcolor=#fefefe
| 509526 ||  || — || December 15, 2007 || Kitt Peak || Spacewatch ||  || align=right data-sort-value="0.61" | 610 m || 
|-id=527 bgcolor=#d6d6d6
| 509527 ||  || — || December 14, 2007 || Mount Lemmon || Mount Lemmon Survey ||  || align=right | 2.8 km || 
|-id=528 bgcolor=#d6d6d6
| 509528 ||  || — || August 29, 2006 || Catalina || CSS ||  || align=right | 2.7 km || 
|-id=529 bgcolor=#FA8072
| 509529 ||  || — || December 16, 2007 || Mount Lemmon || Mount Lemmon Survey ||  || align=right data-sort-value="0.65" | 650 m || 
|-id=530 bgcolor=#d6d6d6
| 509530 ||  || — || December 17, 2007 || Mount Lemmon || Mount Lemmon Survey ||  || align=right | 2.8 km || 
|-id=531 bgcolor=#fefefe
| 509531 ||  || — || December 17, 2007 || Mount Lemmon || Mount Lemmon Survey ||  || align=right data-sort-value="0.45" | 450 m || 
|-id=532 bgcolor=#fefefe
| 509532 ||  || — || December 6, 2007 || Kitt Peak || Spacewatch ||  || align=right data-sort-value="0.66" | 660 m || 
|-id=533 bgcolor=#d6d6d6
| 509533 ||  || — || December 30, 2007 || Kitt Peak || Spacewatch ||  || align=right | 2.1 km || 
|-id=534 bgcolor=#fefefe
| 509534 ||  || — || December 18, 2007 || Mount Lemmon || Mount Lemmon Survey ||  || align=right data-sort-value="0.66" | 660 m || 
|-id=535 bgcolor=#d6d6d6
| 509535 ||  || — || December 19, 2007 || Mount Lemmon || Mount Lemmon Survey ||  || align=right | 2.5 km || 
|-id=536 bgcolor=#d6d6d6
| 509536 ||  || — || September 25, 2006 || Mount Lemmon || Mount Lemmon Survey ||  || align=right | 2.0 km || 
|-id=537 bgcolor=#fefefe
| 509537 ||  || — || January 1, 2008 || Kitt Peak || Spacewatch ||  || align=right data-sort-value="0.63" | 630 m || 
|-id=538 bgcolor=#d6d6d6
| 509538 ||  || — || December 30, 2007 || Kitt Peak || Spacewatch || BRA || align=right | 1.6 km || 
|-id=539 bgcolor=#fefefe
| 509539 ||  || — || January 10, 2008 || Mount Lemmon || Mount Lemmon Survey ||  || align=right data-sort-value="0.52" | 520 m || 
|-id=540 bgcolor=#d6d6d6
| 509540 ||  || — || January 10, 2008 || Mount Lemmon || Mount Lemmon Survey ||  || align=right | 2.0 km || 
|-id=541 bgcolor=#d6d6d6
| 509541 ||  || — || January 10, 2008 || Kitt Peak || Spacewatch ||  || align=right | 2.2 km || 
|-id=542 bgcolor=#d6d6d6
| 509542 ||  || — || January 11, 2008 || Kitt Peak || Spacewatch ||  || align=right | 2.0 km || 
|-id=543 bgcolor=#d6d6d6
| 509543 ||  || — || January 11, 2008 || Kitt Peak || Spacewatch ||  || align=right | 2.0 km || 
|-id=544 bgcolor=#d6d6d6
| 509544 ||  || — || December 31, 2007 || Kitt Peak || Spacewatch ||  || align=right | 2.2 km || 
|-id=545 bgcolor=#fefefe
| 509545 ||  || — || January 14, 2008 || Kitt Peak || Spacewatch || H || align=right data-sort-value="0.65" | 650 m || 
|-id=546 bgcolor=#d6d6d6
| 509546 ||  || — || December 30, 2007 || Kitt Peak || Spacewatch ||  || align=right | 1.8 km || 
|-id=547 bgcolor=#d6d6d6
| 509547 ||  || — || December 30, 2007 || Kitt Peak || Spacewatch ||  || align=right | 1.6 km || 
|-id=548 bgcolor=#fefefe
| 509548 ||  || — || January 12, 2008 || Catalina || CSS || H || align=right data-sort-value="0.92" | 920 m || 
|-id=549 bgcolor=#d6d6d6
| 509549 ||  || — || January 11, 2008 || Kitt Peak || Spacewatch ||  || align=right | 3.1 km || 
|-id=550 bgcolor=#d6d6d6
| 509550 ||  || — || January 1, 2008 || Kitt Peak || Spacewatch ||  || align=right | 1.7 km || 
|-id=551 bgcolor=#d6d6d6
| 509551 ||  || — || November 11, 2007 || Mount Lemmon || Mount Lemmon Survey ||  || align=right | 3.3 km || 
|-id=552 bgcolor=#d6d6d6
| 509552 ||  || — || June 15, 2005 || Mount Lemmon || Mount Lemmon Survey ||  || align=right | 3.1 km || 
|-id=553 bgcolor=#fefefe
| 509553 ||  || — || January 10, 2008 || Catalina || CSS ||  || align=right | 1.1 km || 
|-id=554 bgcolor=#fefefe
| 509554 ||  || — || December 30, 2007 || Kitt Peak || Spacewatch ||  || align=right data-sort-value="0.68" | 680 m || 
|-id=555 bgcolor=#d6d6d6
| 509555 ||  || — || January 31, 2008 || Catalina || CSS ||  || align=right | 1.8 km || 
|-id=556 bgcolor=#fefefe
| 509556 ||  || — || January 17, 2008 || Mount Lemmon || Mount Lemmon Survey ||  || align=right data-sort-value="0.57" | 570 m || 
|-id=557 bgcolor=#d6d6d6
| 509557 ||  || — || January 20, 2008 || Kitt Peak || Spacewatch ||  || align=right | 3.3 km || 
|-id=558 bgcolor=#d6d6d6
| 509558 ||  || — || January 30, 2008 || Kitt Peak || Spacewatch ||  || align=right | 2.0 km || 
|-id=559 bgcolor=#d6d6d6
| 509559 ||  || — || January 31, 2008 || Catalina || CSS ||  || align=right | 2.5 km || 
|-id=560 bgcolor=#d6d6d6
| 509560 ||  || — || February 2, 2008 || Mount Lemmon || Mount Lemmon Survey ||  || align=right | 2.1 km || 
|-id=561 bgcolor=#fefefe
| 509561 ||  || — || February 3, 2008 || Catalina || CSS || H || align=right data-sort-value="0.50" | 500 m || 
|-id=562 bgcolor=#d6d6d6
| 509562 ||  || — || February 3, 2008 || Kitt Peak || Spacewatch ||  || align=right | 2.6 km || 
|-id=563 bgcolor=#FA8072
| 509563 ||  || — || February 7, 2008 || Bisei SG Center || BATTeRS ||  || align=right data-sort-value="0.61" | 610 m || 
|-id=564 bgcolor=#d6d6d6
| 509564 ||  || — || February 2, 2008 || Kitt Peak || Spacewatch ||  || align=right | 2.1 km || 
|-id=565 bgcolor=#d6d6d6
| 509565 ||  || — || January 13, 2008 || Kitt Peak || Spacewatch || HYG || align=right | 1.9 km || 
|-id=566 bgcolor=#d6d6d6
| 509566 ||  || — || February 2, 2008 || Kitt Peak || Spacewatch ||  || align=right | 1.7 km || 
|-id=567 bgcolor=#fefefe
| 509567 ||  || — || February 2, 2008 || Kitt Peak || Spacewatch ||  || align=right data-sort-value="0.63" | 630 m || 
|-id=568 bgcolor=#d6d6d6
| 509568 ||  || — || January 10, 2008 || Mount Lemmon || Mount Lemmon Survey ||  || align=right | 2.4 km || 
|-id=569 bgcolor=#FFC2E0
| 509569 ||  || — || February 9, 2008 || Mount Lemmon || Mount Lemmon Survey || AMO || align=right data-sort-value="0.21" | 210 m || 
|-id=570 bgcolor=#d6d6d6
| 509570 ||  || — || February 7, 2008 || Kitt Peak || Spacewatch ||  || align=right | 2.0 km || 
|-id=571 bgcolor=#fefefe
| 509571 ||  || — || January 11, 2008 || Mount Lemmon || Mount Lemmon Survey ||  || align=right data-sort-value="0.68" | 680 m || 
|-id=572 bgcolor=#d6d6d6
| 509572 ||  || — || February 7, 2008 || Mount Lemmon || Mount Lemmon Survey ||  || align=right | 2.5 km || 
|-id=573 bgcolor=#fefefe
| 509573 ||  || — || January 30, 2008 || Mount Lemmon || Mount Lemmon Survey ||  || align=right data-sort-value="0.59" | 590 m || 
|-id=574 bgcolor=#d6d6d6
| 509574 ||  || — || February 2, 2008 || Kitt Peak || Spacewatch ||  || align=right | 2.0 km || 
|-id=575 bgcolor=#fefefe
| 509575 ||  || — || February 9, 2008 || Kitt Peak || Spacewatch ||  || align=right data-sort-value="0.69" | 690 m || 
|-id=576 bgcolor=#fefefe
| 509576 ||  || — || January 30, 2008 || Mount Lemmon || Mount Lemmon Survey ||  || align=right data-sort-value="0.66" | 660 m || 
|-id=577 bgcolor=#fefefe
| 509577 ||  || — || February 8, 2008 || Kitt Peak || Spacewatch ||  || align=right data-sort-value="0.64" | 640 m || 
|-id=578 bgcolor=#d6d6d6
| 509578 ||  || — || February 2, 2008 || Kitt Peak || Spacewatch ||  || align=right | 1.7 km || 
|-id=579 bgcolor=#fefefe
| 509579 ||  || — || February 2, 2008 || Kitt Peak || Spacewatch ||  || align=right data-sort-value="0.57" | 570 m || 
|-id=580 bgcolor=#d6d6d6
| 509580 ||  || — || February 2, 2008 || Kitt Peak || Spacewatch ||  || align=right | 1.9 km || 
|-id=581 bgcolor=#fefefe
| 509581 ||  || — || February 11, 2008 || Mount Lemmon || Mount Lemmon Survey ||  || align=right data-sort-value="0.69" | 690 m || 
|-id=582 bgcolor=#d6d6d6
| 509582 ||  || — || February 10, 2008 || Mount Lemmon || Mount Lemmon Survey ||  || align=right | 2.4 km || 
|-id=583 bgcolor=#d6d6d6
| 509583 ||  || — || February 13, 2008 || Kitt Peak || Spacewatch ||  || align=right | 2.0 km || 
|-id=584 bgcolor=#d6d6d6
| 509584 ||  || — || February 8, 2008 || Kitt Peak || Spacewatch ||  || align=right | 2.0 km || 
|-id=585 bgcolor=#d6d6d6
| 509585 ||  || — || February 8, 2008 || Kitt Peak || Spacewatch ||  || align=right | 1.8 km || 
|-id=586 bgcolor=#fefefe
| 509586 ||  || — || February 7, 2008 || Mount Lemmon || Mount Lemmon Survey || H || align=right data-sort-value="0.71" | 710 m || 
|-id=587 bgcolor=#fefefe
| 509587 ||  || — || February 7, 2008 || Kitt Peak || Spacewatch ||  || align=right data-sort-value="0.58" | 580 m || 
|-id=588 bgcolor=#fefefe
| 509588 ||  || — || February 7, 2008 || Mount Lemmon || Mount Lemmon Survey ||  || align=right data-sort-value="0.57" | 570 m || 
|-id=589 bgcolor=#fefefe
| 509589 ||  || — || February 13, 2008 || Kitt Peak || Spacewatch || H || align=right data-sort-value="0.63" | 630 m || 
|-id=590 bgcolor=#fefefe
| 509590 ||  || — || February 28, 2008 || Mount Lemmon || Mount Lemmon Survey ||  || align=right data-sort-value="0.68" | 680 m || 
|-id=591 bgcolor=#fefefe
| 509591 ||  || — || December 17, 2007 || Mount Lemmon || Mount Lemmon Survey ||  || align=right data-sort-value="0.77" | 770 m || 
|-id=592 bgcolor=#fefefe
| 509592 ||  || — || February 11, 2008 || Mount Lemmon || Mount Lemmon Survey ||  || align=right data-sort-value="0.71" | 710 m || 
|-id=593 bgcolor=#fefefe
| 509593 ||  || — || February 27, 2008 || Kitt Peak || Spacewatch ||  || align=right data-sort-value="0.62" | 620 m || 
|-id=594 bgcolor=#FA8072
| 509594 ||  || — || February 27, 2008 || Mount Lemmon || Mount Lemmon Survey ||  || align=right | 1.8 km || 
|-id=595 bgcolor=#fefefe
| 509595 ||  || — || February 28, 2008 || Kitt Peak || Spacewatch ||  || align=right data-sort-value="0.73" | 730 m || 
|-id=596 bgcolor=#d6d6d6
| 509596 ||  || — || February 26, 2008 || Mount Lemmon || Mount Lemmon Survey ||  || align=right | 1.9 km || 
|-id=597 bgcolor=#d6d6d6
| 509597 ||  || — || January 11, 2008 || Mount Lemmon || Mount Lemmon Survey ||  || align=right | 2.5 km || 
|-id=598 bgcolor=#d6d6d6
| 509598 ||  || — || February 8, 2008 || Mount Lemmon || Mount Lemmon Survey ||  || align=right | 2.3 km || 
|-id=599 bgcolor=#d6d6d6
| 509599 ||  || — || March 1, 2008 || Kitt Peak || Spacewatch ||  || align=right | 2.1 km || 
|-id=600 bgcolor=#fefefe
| 509600 ||  || — || February 6, 2008 || Catalina || CSS ||  || align=right data-sort-value="0.82" | 820 m || 
|}

509601–509700 

|-bgcolor=#d6d6d6
| 509601 ||  || — || March 3, 2008 || Mount Lemmon || Mount Lemmon Survey ||  || align=right | 2.6 km || 
|-id=602 bgcolor=#d6d6d6
| 509602 ||  || — || December 14, 2007 || Mount Lemmon || Mount Lemmon Survey || TIR || align=right | 3.0 km || 
|-id=603 bgcolor=#d6d6d6
| 509603 ||  || — || February 9, 2008 || Catalina || CSS ||  || align=right | 1.8 km || 
|-id=604 bgcolor=#d6d6d6
| 509604 ||  || — || November 21, 2006 || Catalina || CSS ||  || align=right | 3.1 km || 
|-id=605 bgcolor=#fefefe
| 509605 ||  || — || February 9, 2008 || Catalina || CSS ||  || align=right data-sort-value="0.82" | 820 m || 
|-id=606 bgcolor=#d6d6d6
| 509606 ||  || — || March 7, 2008 || Kitt Peak || Spacewatch ||  || align=right | 2.4 km || 
|-id=607 bgcolor=#d6d6d6
| 509607 ||  || — || February 9, 2008 || Kitt Peak || Spacewatch ||  || align=right | 2.4 km || 
|-id=608 bgcolor=#FA8072
| 509608 ||  || — || March 2, 2008 || Catalina || CSS ||  || align=right data-sort-value="0.95" | 950 m || 
|-id=609 bgcolor=#fefefe
| 509609 ||  || — || March 5, 2008 || Mount Lemmon || Mount Lemmon Survey ||  || align=right data-sort-value="0.68" | 680 m || 
|-id=610 bgcolor=#fefefe
| 509610 ||  || — || February 29, 2008 || XuYi || PMO NEO || V || align=right data-sort-value="0.66" | 660 m || 
|-id=611 bgcolor=#fefefe
| 509611 ||  || — || March 7, 2008 || Mount Lemmon || Mount Lemmon Survey ||  || align=right data-sort-value="0.53" | 530 m || 
|-id=612 bgcolor=#fefefe
| 509612 ||  || — || March 10, 2008 || Kitt Peak || Spacewatch ||  || align=right data-sort-value="0.67" | 670 m || 
|-id=613 bgcolor=#fefefe
| 509613 ||  || — || March 10, 2008 || Kitt Peak || Spacewatch || NYS || align=right data-sort-value="0.50" | 500 m || 
|-id=614 bgcolor=#fefefe
| 509614 ||  || — || March 12, 2008 || Mount Lemmon || Mount Lemmon Survey ||  || align=right data-sort-value="0.59" | 590 m || 
|-id=615 bgcolor=#fefefe
| 509615 ||  || — || March 6, 2008 || Mount Lemmon || Mount Lemmon Survey ||  || align=right data-sort-value="0.73" | 730 m || 
|-id=616 bgcolor=#d6d6d6
| 509616 ||  || — || March 1, 2008 || Mount Lemmon || Mount Lemmon Survey ||  || align=right | 3.3 km || 
|-id=617 bgcolor=#d6d6d6
| 509617 ||  || — || February 10, 2008 || Kitt Peak || Spacewatch ||  || align=right | 1.9 km || 
|-id=618 bgcolor=#d6d6d6
| 509618 ||  || — || February 8, 2008 || Kitt Peak || Spacewatch ||  || align=right | 2.0 km || 
|-id=619 bgcolor=#d6d6d6
| 509619 ||  || — || March 26, 2008 || Mount Lemmon || Mount Lemmon Survey ||  || align=right | 2.0 km || 
|-id=620 bgcolor=#d6d6d6
| 509620 ||  || — || February 13, 2008 || Mount Lemmon || Mount Lemmon Survey ||  || align=right | 2.7 km || 
|-id=621 bgcolor=#fefefe
| 509621 ||  || — || March 13, 2008 || Kitt Peak || Spacewatch ||  || align=right data-sort-value="0.62" | 620 m || 
|-id=622 bgcolor=#d6d6d6
| 509622 ||  || — || January 11, 2008 || Mount Lemmon || Mount Lemmon Survey ||  || align=right | 2.4 km || 
|-id=623 bgcolor=#fefefe
| 509623 ||  || — || March 28, 2008 || Mount Lemmon || Mount Lemmon Survey ||  || align=right data-sort-value="0.68" | 680 m || 
|-id=624 bgcolor=#d6d6d6
| 509624 ||  || — || March 10, 2008 || Mount Lemmon || Mount Lemmon Survey ||  || align=right | 2.2 km || 
|-id=625 bgcolor=#d6d6d6
| 509625 ||  || — || February 12, 2008 || Kitt Peak || Spacewatch ||  || align=right | 2.2 km || 
|-id=626 bgcolor=#d6d6d6
| 509626 ||  || — || March 28, 2008 || Mount Lemmon || Mount Lemmon Survey || THM || align=right | 2.1 km || 
|-id=627 bgcolor=#fefefe
| 509627 ||  || — || February 13, 2008 || Mount Lemmon || Mount Lemmon Survey ||  || align=right data-sort-value="0.68" | 680 m || 
|-id=628 bgcolor=#d6d6d6
| 509628 ||  || — || March 10, 2008 || Mount Lemmon || Mount Lemmon Survey || HYG || align=right | 2.3 km || 
|-id=629 bgcolor=#fefefe
| 509629 ||  || — || March 30, 2008 || Kitt Peak || Spacewatch ||  || align=right data-sort-value="0.54" | 540 m || 
|-id=630 bgcolor=#FA8072
| 509630 ||  || — || March 27, 2008 || Kitt Peak || Spacewatch || H || align=right data-sort-value="0.68" | 680 m || 
|-id=631 bgcolor=#fefefe
| 509631 ||  || — || March 30, 2008 || Kitt Peak || Spacewatch ||  || align=right data-sort-value="0.95" | 950 m || 
|-id=632 bgcolor=#d6d6d6
| 509632 ||  || — || March 31, 2008 || Mount Lemmon || Mount Lemmon Survey ||  || align=right | 2.9 km || 
|-id=633 bgcolor=#d6d6d6
| 509633 ||  || — || March 29, 2008 || Kitt Peak || Spacewatch ||  || align=right | 2.5 km || 
|-id=634 bgcolor=#C2FFFF
| 509634 ||  || — || March 28, 2008 || Mount Lemmon || Mount Lemmon Survey || L5 || align=right | 11 km || 
|-id=635 bgcolor=#fefefe
| 509635 ||  || — || March 28, 2008 || Kitt Peak || Spacewatch ||  || align=right data-sort-value="0.68" | 680 m || 
|-id=636 bgcolor=#d6d6d6
| 509636 ||  || — || March 10, 2008 || Kitt Peak || Spacewatch ||  || align=right | 2.7 km || 
|-id=637 bgcolor=#d6d6d6
| 509637 ||  || — || March 28, 2008 || Kitt Peak || Spacewatch ||  || align=right | 2.1 km || 
|-id=638 bgcolor=#d6d6d6
| 509638 ||  || — || March 30, 2008 || Socorro || LINEAR ||  || align=right | 2.5 km || 
|-id=639 bgcolor=#d6d6d6
| 509639 ||  || — || March 31, 2008 || Kitt Peak || Spacewatch ||  || align=right | 3.9 km || 
|-id=640 bgcolor=#fefefe
| 509640 ||  || — || February 28, 2008 || Mount Lemmon || Mount Lemmon Survey ||  || align=right data-sort-value="0.72" | 720 m || 
|-id=641 bgcolor=#fefefe
| 509641 ||  || — || April 1, 2008 || Kitt Peak || Spacewatch ||  || align=right data-sort-value="0.82" | 820 m || 
|-id=642 bgcolor=#fefefe
| 509642 ||  || — || April 1, 2008 || Kitt Peak || Spacewatch ||  || align=right data-sort-value="0.59" | 590 m || 
|-id=643 bgcolor=#fefefe
| 509643 ||  || — || March 4, 2008 || Mount Lemmon || Mount Lemmon Survey ||  || align=right data-sort-value="0.62" | 620 m || 
|-id=644 bgcolor=#d6d6d6
| 509644 ||  || — || March 30, 2008 || Kitt Peak || Spacewatch ||  || align=right | 2.8 km || 
|-id=645 bgcolor=#d6d6d6
| 509645 ||  || — || March 13, 2008 || Kitt Peak || Spacewatch ||  || align=right | 2.2 km || 
|-id=646 bgcolor=#d6d6d6
| 509646 ||  || — || April 4, 2008 || Mount Lemmon || Mount Lemmon Survey || EOS || align=right | 1.4 km || 
|-id=647 bgcolor=#fefefe
| 509647 ||  || — || March 29, 2008 || Kitt Peak || Spacewatch ||  || align=right data-sort-value="0.54" | 540 m || 
|-id=648 bgcolor=#fefefe
| 509648 ||  || — || April 5, 2008 || Kitt Peak || Spacewatch ||  || align=right data-sort-value="0.72" | 720 m || 
|-id=649 bgcolor=#d6d6d6
| 509649 ||  || — || April 5, 2008 || Mount Lemmon || Mount Lemmon Survey ||  || align=right | 2.2 km || 
|-id=650 bgcolor=#fefefe
| 509650 ||  || — || March 10, 2008 || Kitt Peak || Spacewatch ||  || align=right data-sort-value="0.59" | 590 m || 
|-id=651 bgcolor=#fefefe
| 509651 ||  || — || March 28, 2008 || Kitt Peak || Spacewatch || ERI || align=right | 1.4 km || 
|-id=652 bgcolor=#fefefe
| 509652 ||  || — || March 29, 2008 || Catalina || CSS || H || align=right data-sort-value="0.57" | 570 m || 
|-id=653 bgcolor=#d6d6d6
| 509653 ||  || — || April 6, 2008 || Kitt Peak || Spacewatch ||  || align=right | 4.0 km || 
|-id=654 bgcolor=#fefefe
| 509654 ||  || — || March 4, 2008 || Mount Lemmon || Mount Lemmon Survey ||  || align=right data-sort-value="0.86" | 860 m || 
|-id=655 bgcolor=#fefefe
| 509655 ||  || — || March 31, 2008 || Mount Lemmon || Mount Lemmon Survey ||  || align=right data-sort-value="0.62" | 620 m || 
|-id=656 bgcolor=#d6d6d6
| 509656 ||  || — || March 12, 2008 || Kitt Peak || Spacewatch ||  || align=right | 2.9 km || 
|-id=657 bgcolor=#d6d6d6
| 509657 ||  || — || March 28, 2008 || Kitt Peak || Spacewatch ||  || align=right | 2.5 km || 
|-id=658 bgcolor=#d6d6d6
| 509658 ||  || — || April 14, 2008 || Mount Lemmon || Mount Lemmon Survey ||  || align=right | 3.0 km || 
|-id=659 bgcolor=#d6d6d6
| 509659 ||  || — || April 3, 2008 || Kitt Peak || Spacewatch || THM || align=right | 2.2 km || 
|-id=660 bgcolor=#d6d6d6
| 509660 ||  || — || April 6, 2008 || Kitt Peak || Spacewatch || VER || align=right | 2.3 km || 
|-id=661 bgcolor=#d6d6d6
| 509661 ||  || — || January 28, 2007 || Kitt Peak || Spacewatch ||  || align=right | 2.6 km || 
|-id=662 bgcolor=#d6d6d6
| 509662 ||  || — || April 3, 2008 || Mount Lemmon || Mount Lemmon Survey ||  || align=right | 2.7 km || 
|-id=663 bgcolor=#d6d6d6
| 509663 ||  || — || April 24, 2008 || Kitt Peak || Spacewatch ||  || align=right | 3.1 km || 
|-id=664 bgcolor=#fefefe
| 509664 ||  || — || April 25, 2008 || Kitt Peak || Spacewatch || H || align=right data-sort-value="0.51" | 510 m || 
|-id=665 bgcolor=#fefefe
| 509665 ||  || — || April 14, 2008 || Mount Lemmon || Mount Lemmon Survey ||  || align=right data-sort-value="0.75" | 750 m || 
|-id=666 bgcolor=#fefefe
| 509666 ||  || — || April 15, 2008 || Kitt Peak || Spacewatch ||  || align=right data-sort-value="0.59" | 590 m || 
|-id=667 bgcolor=#d6d6d6
| 509667 ||  || — || April 29, 2008 || Kitt Peak || Spacewatch ||  || align=right | 2.9 km || 
|-id=668 bgcolor=#d6d6d6
| 509668 ||  || — || April 15, 2008 || Mount Lemmon || Mount Lemmon Survey ||  || align=right | 2.7 km || 
|-id=669 bgcolor=#fefefe
| 509669 ||  || — || April 4, 2008 || Kitt Peak || Spacewatch ||  || align=right data-sort-value="0.66" | 660 m || 
|-id=670 bgcolor=#fefefe
| 509670 ||  || — || April 16, 2008 || Catalina || CSS ||  || align=right data-sort-value="0.92" | 920 m || 
|-id=671 bgcolor=#d6d6d6
| 509671 ||  || — || April 12, 2008 || Mount Lemmon || Mount Lemmon Survey ||  || align=right | 2.8 km || 
|-id=672 bgcolor=#fefefe
| 509672 ||  || — || May 3, 2008 || Kitt Peak || Spacewatch ||  || align=right data-sort-value="0.76" | 760 m || 
|-id=673 bgcolor=#d6d6d6
| 509673 ||  || — || April 6, 2008 || Kitt Peak || Spacewatch ||  || align=right | 2.7 km || 
|-id=674 bgcolor=#d6d6d6
| 509674 ||  || — || April 14, 2008 || Mount Lemmon || Mount Lemmon Survey ||  || align=right | 2.4 km || 
|-id=675 bgcolor=#d6d6d6
| 509675 ||  || — || May 27, 2008 || Kitt Peak || Spacewatch ||  || align=right | 2.9 km || 
|-id=676 bgcolor=#fefefe
| 509676 ||  || — || November 1, 2006 || Catalina || CSS || H || align=right data-sort-value="0.87" | 870 m || 
|-id=677 bgcolor=#FA8072
| 509677 ||  || — || June 1, 2008 || Kitt Peak || Spacewatch || H || align=right data-sort-value="0.53" | 530 m || 
|-id=678 bgcolor=#d6d6d6
| 509678 ||  || — || April 26, 2008 || Kitt Peak || Spacewatch ||  || align=right | 2.8 km || 
|-id=679 bgcolor=#fefefe
| 509679 ||  || — || June 5, 2008 || Siding Spring || SSS ||  || align=right | 1.0 km || 
|-id=680 bgcolor=#fefefe
| 509680 ||  || — || May 3, 2008 || Mount Lemmon || Mount Lemmon Survey ||  || align=right data-sort-value="0.77" | 770 m || 
|-id=681 bgcolor=#E9E9E9
| 509681 ||  || — || July 28, 2008 || Dauban || F. Kugel || (1547) || align=right | 1.5 km || 
|-id=682 bgcolor=#E9E9E9
| 509682 ||  || — || May 29, 2008 || Mount Lemmon || Mount Lemmon Survey || KON || align=right | 2.1 km || 
|-id=683 bgcolor=#E9E9E9
| 509683 ||  || — || August 5, 2008 || Siding Spring || SSS ||  || align=right | 1.0 km || 
|-id=684 bgcolor=#E9E9E9
| 509684 ||  || — || August 12, 2008 || Socorro || LINEAR ||  || align=right | 1.6 km || 
|-id=685 bgcolor=#E9E9E9
| 509685 ||  || — || August 26, 2008 || La Sagra || OAM Obs. ||  || align=right data-sort-value="0.93" | 930 m || 
|-id=686 bgcolor=#d6d6d6
| 509686 ||  || — || August 31, 2008 || La Sagra || OAM Obs. || Tj (2.99) || align=right | 3.9 km || 
|-id=687 bgcolor=#E9E9E9
| 509687 ||  || — || August 28, 2008 || La Sagra || OAM Obs. ||  || align=right | 1.8 km || 
|-id=688 bgcolor=#E9E9E9
| 509688 ||  || — || August 25, 2008 || La Sagra || OAM Obs. ||  || align=right data-sort-value="0.95" | 950 m || 
|-id=689 bgcolor=#E9E9E9
| 509689 ||  || — || August 23, 2008 || Kitt Peak || Spacewatch ||  || align=right | 1.4 km || 
|-id=690 bgcolor=#E9E9E9
| 509690 ||  || — || September 2, 2008 || Kitt Peak || Spacewatch ||  || align=right | 1.9 km || 
|-id=691 bgcolor=#fefefe
| 509691 ||  || — || September 3, 2008 || Kitt Peak || Spacewatch ||  || align=right data-sort-value="0.68" | 680 m || 
|-id=692 bgcolor=#E9E9E9
| 509692 ||  || — || September 5, 2008 || Socorro || LINEAR ||  || align=right | 1.0 km || 
|-id=693 bgcolor=#E9E9E9
| 509693 ||  || — || September 4, 2008 || Kitt Peak || Spacewatch ||  || align=right | 1.5 km || 
|-id=694 bgcolor=#E9E9E9
| 509694 ||  || — || September 4, 2008 || Kitt Peak || Spacewatch ||  || align=right | 1.5 km || 
|-id=695 bgcolor=#E9E9E9
| 509695 ||  || — || September 9, 2008 || Siding Spring || SSS ||  || align=right | 2.0 km || 
|-id=696 bgcolor=#E9E9E9
| 509696 ||  || — || September 8, 2008 || Siding Spring || SSS ||  || align=right | 1.4 km || 
|-id=697 bgcolor=#C2FFFF
| 509697 ||  || — || September 2, 2008 || Kitt Peak || Spacewatch || L4 || align=right | 7.0 km || 
|-id=698 bgcolor=#E9E9E9
| 509698 ||  || — || September 6, 2008 || Catalina || CSS ||  || align=right | 1.3 km || 
|-id=699 bgcolor=#E9E9E9
| 509699 ||  || — || September 6, 2008 || Catalina || CSS ||  || align=right data-sort-value="0.84" | 840 m || 
|-id=700 bgcolor=#E9E9E9
| 509700 ||  || — || September 6, 2008 || Kitt Peak || Spacewatch ||  || align=right data-sort-value="0.68" | 680 m || 
|}

509701–509800 

|-bgcolor=#E9E9E9
| 509701 ||  || — || September 4, 2008 || Kitt Peak || Spacewatch ||  || align=right | 1.3 km || 
|-id=702 bgcolor=#E9E9E9
| 509702 ||  || — || September 4, 2008 || Kitt Peak || Spacewatch ||  || align=right | 1.3 km || 
|-id=703 bgcolor=#E9E9E9
| 509703 ||  || — || September 5, 2008 || Kitt Peak || Spacewatch ||  || align=right | 1.2 km || 
|-id=704 bgcolor=#E9E9E9
| 509704 ||  || — || September 20, 2008 || Mount Lemmon || Mount Lemmon Survey ||  || align=right data-sort-value="0.92" | 920 m || 
|-id=705 bgcolor=#E9E9E9
| 509705 ||  || — || September 20, 2008 || Mount Lemmon || Mount Lemmon Survey ||  || align=right | 1.2 km || 
|-id=706 bgcolor=#E9E9E9
| 509706 ||  || — || September 20, 2008 || Kitt Peak || Spacewatch || MIS || align=right | 1.9 km || 
|-id=707 bgcolor=#E9E9E9
| 509707 ||  || — || September 21, 2008 || Mount Lemmon || Mount Lemmon Survey ||  || align=right | 1.7 km || 
|-id=708 bgcolor=#E9E9E9
| 509708 ||  || — || September 21, 2008 || Catalina || CSS ||  || align=right | 1.3 km || 
|-id=709 bgcolor=#E9E9E9
| 509709 ||  || — || September 22, 2008 || Mount Lemmon || Mount Lemmon Survey || EUN || align=right | 1.2 km || 
|-id=710 bgcolor=#E9E9E9
| 509710 ||  || — || August 24, 2008 || Kitt Peak || Spacewatch ||  || align=right | 1.0 km || 
|-id=711 bgcolor=#E9E9E9
| 509711 ||  || — || September 21, 2008 || Kitt Peak || Spacewatch ||  || align=right | 1.0 km || 
|-id=712 bgcolor=#E9E9E9
| 509712 ||  || — || September 21, 2008 || Kitt Peak || Spacewatch ||  || align=right data-sort-value="0.71" | 710 m || 
|-id=713 bgcolor=#E9E9E9
| 509713 ||  || — || September 21, 2008 || Kitt Peak || Spacewatch ||  || align=right data-sort-value="0.98" | 980 m || 
|-id=714 bgcolor=#E9E9E9
| 509714 ||  || — || October 5, 2004 || Kitt Peak || Spacewatch ||  || align=right | 1.1 km || 
|-id=715 bgcolor=#fefefe
| 509715 ||  || — || September 22, 2008 || Mount Lemmon || Mount Lemmon Survey ||  || align=right data-sort-value="0.78" | 780 m || 
|-id=716 bgcolor=#E9E9E9
| 509716 ||  || — || September 22, 2008 || Kitt Peak || Spacewatch ||  || align=right data-sort-value="0.74" | 740 m || 
|-id=717 bgcolor=#E9E9E9
| 509717 ||  || — || September 22, 2008 || Kitt Peak || Spacewatch ||  || align=right data-sort-value="0.98" | 980 m || 
|-id=718 bgcolor=#E9E9E9
| 509718 ||  || — || September 24, 2008 || Mount Lemmon || Mount Lemmon Survey ||  || align=right data-sort-value="0.85" | 850 m || 
|-id=719 bgcolor=#E9E9E9
| 509719 ||  || — || September 23, 2008 || Socorro || LINEAR ||  || align=right | 1.4 km || 
|-id=720 bgcolor=#E9E9E9
| 509720 ||  || — || September 24, 2008 || Socorro || LINEAR || (1547) || align=right | 1.7 km || 
|-id=721 bgcolor=#E9E9E9
| 509721 ||  || — || September 28, 2008 || Socorro || LINEAR || MIS || align=right | 2.4 km || 
|-id=722 bgcolor=#E9E9E9
| 509722 ||  || — || September 5, 2008 || La Sagra || OAM Obs. ||  || align=right | 1.6 km || 
|-id=723 bgcolor=#E9E9E9
| 509723 ||  || — || September 24, 2008 || Kitt Peak || Spacewatch ||  || align=right | 1.0 km || 
|-id=724 bgcolor=#fefefe
| 509724 ||  || — || September 25, 2008 || Kitt Peak || Spacewatch || CLA || align=right | 1.2 km || 
|-id=725 bgcolor=#E9E9E9
| 509725 ||  || — || September 26, 2008 || Kitt Peak || Spacewatch ||  || align=right data-sort-value="0.99" | 990 m || 
|-id=726 bgcolor=#E9E9E9
| 509726 ||  || — || September 26, 2008 || Kitt Peak || Spacewatch ||  || align=right | 1.8 km || 
|-id=727 bgcolor=#fefefe
| 509727 ||  || — || September 27, 2008 || Catalina || CSS || H || align=right | 1.1 km || 
|-id=728 bgcolor=#E9E9E9
| 509728 ||  || — || September 28, 2008 || Mount Lemmon || Mount Lemmon Survey ||  || align=right | 1.3 km || 
|-id=729 bgcolor=#E9E9E9
| 509729 ||  || — || September 28, 2008 || Mount Lemmon || Mount Lemmon Survey ||  || align=right data-sort-value="0.92" | 920 m || 
|-id=730 bgcolor=#E9E9E9
| 509730 ||  || — || September 4, 2008 || Kitt Peak || Spacewatch ||  || align=right | 1.2 km || 
|-id=731 bgcolor=#E9E9E9
| 509731 ||  || — || September 24, 2008 || Kitt Peak || Spacewatch ||  || align=right | 1.4 km || 
|-id=732 bgcolor=#E9E9E9
| 509732 ||  || — || September 23, 2008 || Catalina || CSS ||  || align=right | 1.4 km || 
|-id=733 bgcolor=#E9E9E9
| 509733 ||  || — || September 26, 2008 || Kitt Peak || Spacewatch ||  || align=right data-sort-value="0.96" | 960 m || 
|-id=734 bgcolor=#E9E9E9
| 509734 ||  || — || September 30, 2008 || Mount Lemmon || Mount Lemmon Survey ||  || align=right | 1.2 km || 
|-id=735 bgcolor=#E9E9E9
| 509735 ||  || — || September 22, 2008 || Kitt Peak || Spacewatch || (5) || align=right data-sort-value="0.65" | 650 m || 
|-id=736 bgcolor=#fefefe
| 509736 ||  || — || September 23, 2008 || Catalina || CSS ||  || align=right data-sort-value="0.90" | 900 m || 
|-id=737 bgcolor=#E9E9E9
| 509737 ||  || — || September 28, 2008 || Catalina || CSS ||  || align=right data-sort-value="0.91" | 910 m || 
|-id=738 bgcolor=#E9E9E9
| 509738 ||  || — || September 23, 2008 || Kitt Peak || Spacewatch || RAF || align=right data-sort-value="0.75" | 750 m || 
|-id=739 bgcolor=#E9E9E9
| 509739 ||  || — || October 15, 2004 || Kitt Peak || Spacewatch ||  || align=right data-sort-value="0.98" | 980 m || 
|-id=740 bgcolor=#E9E9E9
| 509740 ||  || — || October 1, 2008 || Mount Lemmon || Mount Lemmon Survey ||  || align=right | 1.0 km || 
|-id=741 bgcolor=#E9E9E9
| 509741 ||  || — || September 6, 2008 || Mount Lemmon || Mount Lemmon Survey ||  || align=right | 1.2 km || 
|-id=742 bgcolor=#E9E9E9
| 509742 ||  || — || October 1, 2008 || Kitt Peak || Spacewatch ||  || align=right | 1.1 km || 
|-id=743 bgcolor=#E9E9E9
| 509743 ||  || — || October 2, 2008 || Kitt Peak || Spacewatch ||  || align=right data-sort-value="0.76" | 760 m || 
|-id=744 bgcolor=#E9E9E9
| 509744 ||  || — || October 2, 2008 || Kitt Peak || Spacewatch ||  || align=right | 1.4 km || 
|-id=745 bgcolor=#E9E9E9
| 509745 ||  || — || September 22, 2008 || Mount Lemmon || Mount Lemmon Survey ||  || align=right | 1.7 km || 
|-id=746 bgcolor=#E9E9E9
| 509746 ||  || — || September 23, 2008 || Kitt Peak || Spacewatch ||  || align=right | 1.2 km || 
|-id=747 bgcolor=#d6d6d6
| 509747 ||  || — || September 2, 2008 || Kitt Peak || Spacewatch || SHU3:2 || align=right | 4.2 km || 
|-id=748 bgcolor=#fefefe
| 509748 ||  || — || October 3, 2008 || Kitt Peak || Spacewatch || H || align=right data-sort-value="0.86" | 860 m || 
|-id=749 bgcolor=#E9E9E9
| 509749 ||  || — || October 3, 2008 || Kitt Peak || Spacewatch ||  || align=right | 1.2 km || 
|-id=750 bgcolor=#E9E9E9
| 509750 ||  || — || October 6, 2008 || Kitt Peak || Spacewatch ||  || align=right | 1.1 km || 
|-id=751 bgcolor=#E9E9E9
| 509751 ||  || — || September 28, 2008 || Catalina || CSS ||  || align=right | 1.8 km || 
|-id=752 bgcolor=#E9E9E9
| 509752 ||  || — || September 23, 2008 || Mount Lemmon || Mount Lemmon Survey ||  || align=right data-sort-value="0.99" | 990 m || 
|-id=753 bgcolor=#E9E9E9
| 509753 ||  || — || September 3, 2008 || Kitt Peak || Spacewatch ||  || align=right | 1.3 km || 
|-id=754 bgcolor=#E9E9E9
| 509754 ||  || — || October 8, 2008 || Mount Lemmon || Mount Lemmon Survey ||  || align=right | 1.0 km || 
|-id=755 bgcolor=#d6d6d6
| 509755 ||  || — || October 2, 2008 || Kitt Peak || Spacewatch || SHU3:2 || align=right | 5.2 km || 
|-id=756 bgcolor=#E9E9E9
| 509756 ||  || — || October 1, 2008 || Kitt Peak || Spacewatch ||  || align=right | 1.2 km || 
|-id=757 bgcolor=#d6d6d6
| 509757 ||  || — || October 2, 2008 || Kitt Peak || Spacewatch || 3:2 || align=right | 4.1 km || 
|-id=758 bgcolor=#E9E9E9
| 509758 ||  || — || October 6, 2008 || Mount Lemmon || Mount Lemmon Survey ||  || align=right | 1.1 km || 
|-id=759 bgcolor=#E9E9E9
| 509759 ||  || — || September 23, 2008 || Catalina || CSS ||  || align=right data-sort-value="0.98" | 980 m || 
|-id=760 bgcolor=#E9E9E9
| 509760 ||  || — || October 3, 2008 || Kitt Peak || Spacewatch ||  || align=right | 1.4 km || 
|-id=761 bgcolor=#E9E9E9
| 509761 Umberto ||  ||  || October 19, 2008 || Farra d'Isonzo || Farra d'Isonzo ||  || align=right | 1.6 km || 
|-id=762 bgcolor=#E9E9E9
| 509762 ||  || — || October 17, 2008 || Kitt Peak || Spacewatch ||  || align=right data-sort-value="0.79" | 790 m || 
|-id=763 bgcolor=#E9E9E9
| 509763 ||  || — || October 20, 2008 || Kitt Peak || Spacewatch || EUN || align=right | 1.1 km || 
|-id=764 bgcolor=#E9E9E9
| 509764 ||  || — || October 6, 2008 || Mount Lemmon || Mount Lemmon Survey ||  || align=right data-sort-value="0.83" | 830 m || 
|-id=765 bgcolor=#E9E9E9
| 509765 ||  || — || October 20, 2008 || Kitt Peak || Spacewatch ||  || align=right | 1.0 km || 
|-id=766 bgcolor=#E9E9E9
| 509766 ||  || — || October 20, 2008 || Kitt Peak || Spacewatch ||  || align=right data-sort-value="0.74" | 740 m || 
|-id=767 bgcolor=#E9E9E9
| 509767 ||  || — || October 20, 2008 || Kitt Peak || Spacewatch ||  || align=right | 1.2 km || 
|-id=768 bgcolor=#fefefe
| 509768 ||  || — || September 22, 2008 || Kitt Peak || Spacewatch ||  || align=right data-sort-value="0.65" | 650 m || 
|-id=769 bgcolor=#E9E9E9
| 509769 ||  || — || October 21, 2008 || Mount Lemmon || Mount Lemmon Survey ||  || align=right | 1.1 km || 
|-id=770 bgcolor=#E9E9E9
| 509770 ||  || — || September 25, 2008 || Mount Lemmon || Mount Lemmon Survey || MRX || align=right data-sort-value="0.97" | 970 m || 
|-id=771 bgcolor=#E9E9E9
| 509771 ||  || — || October 20, 2008 || Mount Lemmon || Mount Lemmon Survey ||  || align=right | 1.2 km || 
|-id=772 bgcolor=#E9E9E9
| 509772 ||  || — || September 29, 2008 || Catalina || CSS ||  || align=right | 1.3 km || 
|-id=773 bgcolor=#E9E9E9
| 509773 ||  || — || September 6, 2008 || Mount Lemmon || Mount Lemmon Survey ||  || align=right | 1.2 km || 
|-id=774 bgcolor=#E9E9E9
| 509774 ||  || — || September 26, 2008 || Kitt Peak || Spacewatch ||  || align=right | 1.2 km || 
|-id=775 bgcolor=#E9E9E9
| 509775 ||  || — || October 22, 2008 || Kitt Peak || Spacewatch ||  || align=right | 1.2 km || 
|-id=776 bgcolor=#E9E9E9
| 509776 ||  || — || October 22, 2008 || Kitt Peak || Spacewatch ||  || align=right data-sort-value="0.82" | 820 m || 
|-id=777 bgcolor=#E9E9E9
| 509777 ||  || — || October 22, 2008 || Kitt Peak || Spacewatch ||  || align=right | 1.8 km || 
|-id=778 bgcolor=#E9E9E9
| 509778 ||  || — || October 23, 2008 || Kitt Peak || Spacewatch ||  || align=right data-sort-value="0.97" | 970 m || 
|-id=779 bgcolor=#E9E9E9
| 509779 ||  || — || October 23, 2008 || Mount Lemmon || Mount Lemmon Survey ||  || align=right | 1.2 km || 
|-id=780 bgcolor=#E9E9E9
| 509780 ||  || — || October 24, 2008 || Kitt Peak || Spacewatch ||  || align=right data-sort-value="0.86" | 860 m || 
|-id=781 bgcolor=#E9E9E9
| 509781 ||  || — || September 26, 2008 || Kitt Peak || Spacewatch ||  || align=right | 1.1 km || 
|-id=782 bgcolor=#E9E9E9
| 509782 ||  || — || October 24, 2008 || Mount Lemmon || Mount Lemmon Survey ||  || align=right | 1.6 km || 
|-id=783 bgcolor=#E9E9E9
| 509783 ||  || — || October 24, 2008 || Mount Lemmon || Mount Lemmon Survey ||  || align=right | 1.4 km || 
|-id=784 bgcolor=#E9E9E9
| 509784 ||  || — || September 27, 2008 || Mount Lemmon || Mount Lemmon Survey || MIS || align=right | 2.0 km || 
|-id=785 bgcolor=#E9E9E9
| 509785 ||  || — || October 25, 2008 || Mount Lemmon || Mount Lemmon Survey ||  || align=right | 2.5 km || 
|-id=786 bgcolor=#E9E9E9
| 509786 ||  || — || October 21, 2008 || Kitt Peak || Spacewatch ||  || align=right | 1.1 km || 
|-id=787 bgcolor=#E9E9E9
| 509787 ||  || — || October 25, 2008 || Kitt Peak || Spacewatch ||  || align=right | 1.1 km || 
|-id=788 bgcolor=#E9E9E9
| 509788 ||  || — || October 6, 2008 || Mount Lemmon || Mount Lemmon Survey ||  || align=right | 1.2 km || 
|-id=789 bgcolor=#E9E9E9
| 509789 ||  || — || October 26, 2008 || Kitt Peak || Spacewatch ||  || align=right | 1.2 km || 
|-id=790 bgcolor=#E9E9E9
| 509790 ||  || — || October 26, 2008 || Kitt Peak || Spacewatch ||  || align=right | 1.4 km || 
|-id=791 bgcolor=#E9E9E9
| 509791 ||  || — || September 7, 2008 || Catalina || CSS ||  || align=right | 1.5 km || 
|-id=792 bgcolor=#E9E9E9
| 509792 ||  || — || September 29, 2008 || Catalina || CSS ||  || align=right | 1.9 km || 
|-id=793 bgcolor=#E9E9E9
| 509793 ||  || — || October 26, 2008 || Kitt Peak || Spacewatch ||  || align=right | 1.0 km || 
|-id=794 bgcolor=#E9E9E9
| 509794 ||  || — || October 27, 2008 || Kitt Peak || Spacewatch ||  || align=right | 1.2 km || 
|-id=795 bgcolor=#E9E9E9
| 509795 ||  || — || October 23, 2008 || Socorro || LINEAR || EUN || align=right | 1.1 km || 
|-id=796 bgcolor=#E9E9E9
| 509796 ||  || — || September 29, 2008 || Catalina || CSS ||  || align=right | 1.5 km || 
|-id=797 bgcolor=#E9E9E9
| 509797 ||  || — || October 29, 2008 || Kitt Peak || Spacewatch ||  || align=right data-sort-value="0.70" | 700 m || 
|-id=798 bgcolor=#E9E9E9
| 509798 ||  || — || October 29, 2008 || Kitt Peak || Spacewatch ||  || align=right | 1.4 km || 
|-id=799 bgcolor=#E9E9E9
| 509799 ||  || — || September 22, 2008 || Mount Lemmon || Mount Lemmon Survey ||  || align=right | 1.4 km || 
|-id=800 bgcolor=#E9E9E9
| 509800 ||  || — || October 30, 2008 || Kitt Peak || Spacewatch ||  || align=right | 1.3 km || 
|}

509801–509900 

|-bgcolor=#E9E9E9
| 509801 ||  || — || October 20, 2008 || Kitt Peak || Spacewatch ||  || align=right | 1.4 km || 
|-id=802 bgcolor=#E9E9E9
| 509802 ||  || — || October 25, 2008 || Socorro || LINEAR || EUN || align=right | 1.1 km || 
|-id=803 bgcolor=#E9E9E9
| 509803 ||  || — || October 28, 2008 || Kitt Peak || Spacewatch ||  || align=right | 1.6 km || 
|-id=804 bgcolor=#E9E9E9
| 509804 ||  || — || October 27, 2008 || Mount Lemmon || Mount Lemmon Survey ||  || align=right | 1.4 km || 
|-id=805 bgcolor=#E9E9E9
| 509805 ||  || — || October 26, 2008 || Kitt Peak || Spacewatch || (1547) || align=right | 1.6 km || 
|-id=806 bgcolor=#FA8072
| 509806 ||  || — || November 2, 2008 || Catalina || CSS ||  || align=right data-sort-value="0.45" | 450 m || 
|-id=807 bgcolor=#E9E9E9
| 509807 ||  || — || November 2, 2008 || Socorro || LINEAR ||  || align=right | 1.9 km || 
|-id=808 bgcolor=#E9E9E9
| 509808 ||  || — || October 5, 2008 || La Sagra || OAM Obs. ||  || align=right | 1.2 km || 
|-id=809 bgcolor=#E9E9E9
| 509809 ||  || — || November 2, 2008 || Mount Lemmon || Mount Lemmon Survey ||  || align=right | 1.3 km || 
|-id=810 bgcolor=#E9E9E9
| 509810 ||  || — || October 24, 2008 || Catalina || CSS ||  || align=right | 1.9 km || 
|-id=811 bgcolor=#E9E9E9
| 509811 ||  || — || October 7, 2008 || Mount Lemmon || Mount Lemmon Survey ||  || align=right | 1.5 km || 
|-id=812 bgcolor=#E9E9E9
| 509812 ||  || — || October 6, 2008 || Mount Lemmon || Mount Lemmon Survey || KON || align=right | 2.4 km || 
|-id=813 bgcolor=#E9E9E9
| 509813 ||  || — || November 3, 2008 || Kitt Peak || Spacewatch ||  || align=right | 1.0 km || 
|-id=814 bgcolor=#E9E9E9
| 509814 ||  || — || November 3, 2008 || Catalina || CSS ||  || align=right | 1.4 km || 
|-id=815 bgcolor=#E9E9E9
| 509815 ||  || — || November 8, 2008 || Kitt Peak || Spacewatch ||  || align=right | 1.1 km || 
|-id=816 bgcolor=#E9E9E9
| 509816 ||  || — || November 7, 2008 || Mount Lemmon || Mount Lemmon Survey ||  || align=right | 1.4 km || 
|-id=817 bgcolor=#E9E9E9
| 509817 ||  || — || October 25, 2008 || Catalina || CSS ||  || align=right | 1.4 km || 
|-id=818 bgcolor=#E9E9E9
| 509818 ||  || — || October 24, 2008 || Kitt Peak || Spacewatch ||  || align=right | 1.1 km || 
|-id=819 bgcolor=#E9E9E9
| 509819 ||  || — || November 17, 2008 || Kitt Peak || Spacewatch ||  || align=right | 1.0 km || 
|-id=820 bgcolor=#E9E9E9
| 509820 ||  || — || October 26, 2008 || Kitt Peak || Spacewatch ||  || align=right | 1.5 km || 
|-id=821 bgcolor=#FFC2E0
| 509821 ||  || — || November 22, 2008 || Kitt Peak || Spacewatch || APOPHA || align=right data-sort-value="0.34" | 340 m || 
|-id=822 bgcolor=#E9E9E9
| 509822 ||  || — || November 19, 2008 || Mount Lemmon || Mount Lemmon Survey ||  || align=right | 1.3 km || 
|-id=823 bgcolor=#E9E9E9
| 509823 ||  || — || November 19, 2008 || Mount Lemmon || Mount Lemmon Survey ||  || align=right | 1.7 km || 
|-id=824 bgcolor=#E9E9E9
| 509824 ||  || — || November 20, 2008 || Kitt Peak || Spacewatch ||  || align=right | 1.3 km || 
|-id=825 bgcolor=#E9E9E9
| 509825 ||  || — || November 18, 2008 || Kitt Peak || Spacewatch ||  || align=right | 1.4 km || 
|-id=826 bgcolor=#E9E9E9
| 509826 ||  || — || November 30, 2008 || Kitt Peak || Spacewatch ||  || align=right | 1.2 km || 
|-id=827 bgcolor=#E9E9E9
| 509827 ||  || — || November 8, 2008 || Kitt Peak || Spacewatch || PAD || align=right | 1.3 km || 
|-id=828 bgcolor=#E9E9E9
| 509828 ||  || — || November 19, 2008 || Kitt Peak || Spacewatch ||  || align=right | 1.3 km || 
|-id=829 bgcolor=#E9E9E9
| 509829 ||  || — || November 30, 2008 || Socorro || LINEAR || EUN || align=right | 1.2 km || 
|-id=830 bgcolor=#E9E9E9
| 509830 ||  || — || October 23, 2008 || Kitt Peak || Spacewatch ||  || align=right | 1.5 km || 
|-id=831 bgcolor=#E9E9E9
| 509831 ||  || — || December 4, 2008 || Socorro || LINEAR ||  || align=right | 1.6 km || 
|-id=832 bgcolor=#E9E9E9
| 509832 ||  || — || November 20, 2008 || Kitt Peak || Spacewatch ||  || align=right | 1.1 km || 
|-id=833 bgcolor=#E9E9E9
| 509833 ||  || — || December 2, 2008 || Mount Lemmon || Mount Lemmon Survey || JUN || align=right data-sort-value="0.86" | 860 m || 
|-id=834 bgcolor=#E9E9E9
| 509834 ||  || — || September 3, 2008 || Kitt Peak || Spacewatch ||  || align=right | 2.6 km || 
|-id=835 bgcolor=#E9E9E9
| 509835 ||  || — || December 1, 2008 || Mount Lemmon || Mount Lemmon Survey ||  || align=right | 2.1 km || 
|-id=836 bgcolor=#E9E9E9
| 509836 ||  || — || December 21, 2008 || Kitt Peak || Spacewatch ||  || align=right | 1.1 km || 
|-id=837 bgcolor=#E9E9E9
| 509837 ||  || — || December 21, 2008 || Mount Lemmon || Mount Lemmon Survey || DOR || align=right | 1.8 km || 
|-id=838 bgcolor=#E9E9E9
| 509838 ||  || — || December 21, 2008 || Mount Lemmon || Mount Lemmon Survey ||  || align=right | 1.8 km || 
|-id=839 bgcolor=#E9E9E9
| 509839 ||  || — || December 21, 2008 || Mount Lemmon || Mount Lemmon Survey ||  || align=right | 2.3 km || 
|-id=840 bgcolor=#E9E9E9
| 509840 ||  || — || November 20, 2008 || Kitt Peak || Spacewatch ||  || align=right | 1.7 km || 
|-id=841 bgcolor=#E9E9E9
| 509841 ||  || — || December 21, 2008 || Kitt Peak || Spacewatch || GEF || align=right data-sort-value="0.98" | 980 m || 
|-id=842 bgcolor=#E9E9E9
| 509842 ||  || — || December 21, 2008 || Kitt Peak || Spacewatch ||  || align=right | 1.9 km || 
|-id=843 bgcolor=#E9E9E9
| 509843 ||  || — || December 29, 2008 || Mount Lemmon || Mount Lemmon Survey ||  || align=right | 2.1 km || 
|-id=844 bgcolor=#E9E9E9
| 509844 ||  || — || December 31, 2008 || Kitt Peak || Spacewatch ||  || align=right | 1.0 km || 
|-id=845 bgcolor=#E9E9E9
| 509845 ||  || — || December 22, 2008 || Kitt Peak || Spacewatch ||  || align=right | 1.4 km || 
|-id=846 bgcolor=#E9E9E9
| 509846 ||  || — || December 30, 2008 || Mount Lemmon || Mount Lemmon Survey ||  || align=right | 1.7 km || 
|-id=847 bgcolor=#E9E9E9
| 509847 ||  || — || November 30, 2008 || Socorro || LINEAR ||  || align=right | 2.6 km || 
|-id=848 bgcolor=#E9E9E9
| 509848 ||  || — || December 29, 2008 || Mount Lemmon || Mount Lemmon Survey ||  || align=right | 1.4 km || 
|-id=849 bgcolor=#E9E9E9
| 509849 ||  || — || December 29, 2008 || Kitt Peak || Spacewatch || WIT || align=right data-sort-value="0.88" | 880 m || 
|-id=850 bgcolor=#E9E9E9
| 509850 ||  || — || December 29, 2008 || Kitt Peak || Spacewatch || GEF || align=right | 1.0 km || 
|-id=851 bgcolor=#E9E9E9
| 509851 ||  || — || December 29, 2008 || Kitt Peak || Spacewatch ||  || align=right | 1.3 km || 
|-id=852 bgcolor=#E9E9E9
| 509852 ||  || — || December 29, 2008 || Kitt Peak || Spacewatch ||  || align=right | 2.4 km || 
|-id=853 bgcolor=#E9E9E9
| 509853 ||  || — || December 31, 2008 || Kitt Peak || Spacewatch ||  || align=right | 1.5 km || 
|-id=854 bgcolor=#E9E9E9
| 509854 ||  || — || December 4, 2008 || Kitt Peak || Spacewatch ||  || align=right | 1.1 km || 
|-id=855 bgcolor=#E9E9E9
| 509855 ||  || — || December 30, 2008 || Kitt Peak || Spacewatch ||  || align=right | 1.9 km || 
|-id=856 bgcolor=#E9E9E9
| 509856 ||  || — || December 29, 2008 || Kitt Peak || Spacewatch ||  || align=right | 1.1 km || 
|-id=857 bgcolor=#E9E9E9
| 509857 ||  || — || December 30, 2008 || Kitt Peak || Spacewatch ||  || align=right | 1.6 km || 
|-id=858 bgcolor=#E9E9E9
| 509858 ||  || — || December 30, 2008 || Kitt Peak || Spacewatch ||  || align=right | 1.5 km || 
|-id=859 bgcolor=#E9E9E9
| 509859 ||  || — || December 21, 2008 || Mount Lemmon || Mount Lemmon Survey || GEF || align=right data-sort-value="0.98" | 980 m || 
|-id=860 bgcolor=#E9E9E9
| 509860 ||  || — || December 21, 2008 || Catalina || CSS || JUN || align=right data-sort-value="0.88" | 880 m || 
|-id=861 bgcolor=#E9E9E9
| 509861 ||  || — || December 19, 2008 || Socorro || LINEAR ||  || align=right | 1.5 km || 
|-id=862 bgcolor=#E9E9E9
| 509862 ||  || — || December 22, 2008 || Kitt Peak || Spacewatch || AEO || align=right data-sort-value="0.95" | 950 m || 
|-id=863 bgcolor=#E9E9E9
| 509863 ||  || — || December 31, 2008 || Kitt Peak || Spacewatch ||  || align=right | 2.7 km || 
|-id=864 bgcolor=#E9E9E9
| 509864 ||  || — || December 1, 2008 || Kitt Peak || Spacewatch ||  || align=right | 1.6 km || 
|-id=865 bgcolor=#E9E9E9
| 509865 ||  || — || December 21, 2008 || Mount Lemmon || Mount Lemmon Survey ||  || align=right | 2.3 km || 
|-id=866 bgcolor=#E9E9E9
| 509866 ||  || — || December 21, 2008 || Kitt Peak || Spacewatch ||  || align=right | 2.0 km || 
|-id=867 bgcolor=#E9E9E9
| 509867 ||  || — || January 15, 2009 || Kitt Peak || Spacewatch ||  || align=right | 1.7 km || 
|-id=868 bgcolor=#E9E9E9
| 509868 ||  || — || December 22, 2008 || Kitt Peak || Spacewatch ||  || align=right | 1.1 km || 
|-id=869 bgcolor=#E9E9E9
| 509869 ||  || — || December 3, 2008 || Kitt Peak || Spacewatch ||  || align=right | 1.7 km || 
|-id=870 bgcolor=#E9E9E9
| 509870 ||  || — || January 7, 2009 || Kitt Peak || Spacewatch || DOR || align=right | 2.2 km || 
|-id=871 bgcolor=#FA8072
| 509871 ||  || — || October 23, 2008 || Socorro || LINEAR ||  || align=right | 1.6 km || 
|-id=872 bgcolor=#E9E9E9
| 509872 ||  || — || November 24, 2008 || Mount Lemmon || Mount Lemmon Survey ||  || align=right | 2.2 km || 
|-id=873 bgcolor=#E9E9E9
| 509873 ||  || — || January 18, 2009 || Kitt Peak || Spacewatch ||  || align=right | 2.3 km || 
|-id=874 bgcolor=#E9E9E9
| 509874 ||  || — || January 1, 2009 || Kitt Peak || Spacewatch ||  || align=right | 2.1 km || 
|-id=875 bgcolor=#E9E9E9
| 509875 ||  || — || January 2, 2009 || Mount Lemmon || Mount Lemmon Survey || GEF || align=right | 1.0 km || 
|-id=876 bgcolor=#E9E9E9
| 509876 ||  || — || December 31, 2008 || Mount Lemmon || Mount Lemmon Survey ||  || align=right | 1.7 km || 
|-id=877 bgcolor=#E9E9E9
| 509877 ||  || — || January 1, 2009 || Mount Lemmon || Mount Lemmon Survey ||  || align=right | 1.6 km || 
|-id=878 bgcolor=#E9E9E9
| 509878 ||  || — || January 16, 2009 || Kitt Peak || Spacewatch ||  || align=right | 1.4 km || 
|-id=879 bgcolor=#E9E9E9
| 509879 ||  || — || January 16, 2009 || Kitt Peak || Spacewatch || DOR || align=right | 1.9 km || 
|-id=880 bgcolor=#E9E9E9
| 509880 ||  || — || October 26, 2008 || Mount Lemmon || Mount Lemmon Survey ||  || align=right | 1.6 km || 
|-id=881 bgcolor=#E9E9E9
| 509881 ||  || — || October 31, 2008 || Mount Lemmon || Mount Lemmon Survey || DOR || align=right | 2.4 km || 
|-id=882 bgcolor=#E9E9E9
| 509882 ||  || — || November 24, 2008 || Mount Lemmon || Mount Lemmon Survey || DOR || align=right | 2.1 km || 
|-id=883 bgcolor=#E9E9E9
| 509883 ||  || — || January 20, 2009 || Kitt Peak || Spacewatch ||  || align=right | 2.0 km || 
|-id=884 bgcolor=#E9E9E9
| 509884 ||  || — || December 22, 2008 || Mount Lemmon || Mount Lemmon Survey ||  || align=right | 2.4 km || 
|-id=885 bgcolor=#E9E9E9
| 509885 ||  || — || December 31, 2008 || Mount Lemmon || Mount Lemmon Survey ||  || align=right | 1.9 km || 
|-id=886 bgcolor=#E9E9E9
| 509886 ||  || — || January 15, 2009 || Kitt Peak || Spacewatch || AEO || align=right data-sort-value="0.92" | 920 m || 
|-id=887 bgcolor=#E9E9E9
| 509887 ||  || — || January 25, 2009 || Kitt Peak || Spacewatch ||  || align=right | 1.4 km || 
|-id=888 bgcolor=#E9E9E9
| 509888 ||  || — || December 30, 2008 || Mount Lemmon || Mount Lemmon Survey ||  || align=right | 2.3 km || 
|-id=889 bgcolor=#E9E9E9
| 509889 ||  || — || November 30, 2008 || Socorro || LINEAR ||  || align=right | 1.3 km || 
|-id=890 bgcolor=#E9E9E9
| 509890 ||  || — || January 15, 2009 || Kitt Peak || Spacewatch ||  || align=right | 1.7 km || 
|-id=891 bgcolor=#E9E9E9
| 509891 ||  || — || December 30, 2008 || Kitt Peak || Spacewatch ||  || align=right | 1.8 km || 
|-id=892 bgcolor=#E9E9E9
| 509892 ||  || — || January 31, 2009 || Kitt Peak || Spacewatch ||  || align=right | 1.6 km || 
|-id=893 bgcolor=#E9E9E9
| 509893 ||  || — || January 29, 2009 || Kitt Peak || Spacewatch ||  || align=right | 1.6 km || 
|-id=894 bgcolor=#E9E9E9
| 509894 ||  || — || January 24, 2009 || Cerro Burek || Alianza S4 Obs. ||  || align=right | 2.0 km || 
|-id=895 bgcolor=#FA8072
| 509895 ||  || — || January 29, 2009 || Catalina || CSS ||  || align=right | 1.8 km || 
|-id=896 bgcolor=#E9E9E9
| 509896 ||  || — || December 30, 2008 || Mount Lemmon || Mount Lemmon Survey || AGN || align=right | 1.1 km || 
|-id=897 bgcolor=#E9E9E9
| 509897 ||  || — || November 23, 2008 || Mount Lemmon || Mount Lemmon Survey ||  || align=right | 2.0 km || 
|-id=898 bgcolor=#E9E9E9
| 509898 ||  || — || September 9, 2007 || Kitt Peak || Spacewatch ||  || align=right | 1.7 km || 
|-id=899 bgcolor=#E9E9E9
| 509899 ||  || — || February 13, 2009 || Kitt Peak || Spacewatch ||  || align=right | 1.9 km || 
|-id=900 bgcolor=#E9E9E9
| 509900 ||  || — || February 14, 2009 || Catalina || CSS ||  || align=right | 2.0 km || 
|}

509901–510000 

|-bgcolor=#E9E9E9
| 509901 ||  || — || March 10, 2005 || Mount Lemmon || Mount Lemmon Survey ||  || align=right | 1.8 km || 
|-id=902 bgcolor=#E9E9E9
| 509902 ||  || — || November 18, 2008 || Kitt Peak || Spacewatch ||  || align=right | 1.4 km || 
|-id=903 bgcolor=#E9E9E9
| 509903 ||  || — || February 20, 2009 || Kitt Peak || Spacewatch ||  || align=right | 1.7 km || 
|-id=904 bgcolor=#d6d6d6
| 509904 ||  || — || February 23, 2009 || Calar Alto || F. Hormuth || KOR || align=right | 1.0 km || 
|-id=905 bgcolor=#E9E9E9
| 509905 ||  || — || February 3, 2009 || Kitt Peak || Spacewatch ||  || align=right | 2.0 km || 
|-id=906 bgcolor=#fefefe
| 509906 ||  || — || February 28, 2009 || Mount Lemmon || Mount Lemmon Survey ||  || align=right data-sort-value="0.65" | 650 m || 
|-id=907 bgcolor=#E9E9E9
| 509907 ||  || — || February 28, 2009 || Mount Lemmon || Mount Lemmon Survey ||  || align=right | 1.8 km || 
|-id=908 bgcolor=#E9E9E9
| 509908 ||  || — || January 25, 2009 || Kitt Peak || Spacewatch || DOR || align=right | 2.1 km || 
|-id=909 bgcolor=#d6d6d6
| 509909 ||  || — || March 15, 2009 || Kitt Peak || Spacewatch ||  || align=right | 2.5 km || 
|-id=910 bgcolor=#E9E9E9
| 509910 ||  || — || March 18, 2009 || La Sagra || OAM Obs. ||  || align=right | 2.6 km || 
|-id=911 bgcolor=#d6d6d6
| 509911 ||  || — || March 16, 2009 || Kitt Peak || Spacewatch ||  || align=right | 3.1 km || 
|-id=912 bgcolor=#E9E9E9
| 509912 ||  || — || March 16, 2009 || Catalina || CSS ||  || align=right | 2.1 km || 
|-id=913 bgcolor=#E9E9E9
| 509913 ||  || — || March 19, 2009 || Catalina || CSS || MRX || align=right | 1.2 km || 
|-id=914 bgcolor=#E9E9E9
| 509914 ||  || — || March 16, 2009 || XuYi || PMO NEO ||  || align=right | 1.8 km || 
|-id=915 bgcolor=#E9E9E9
| 509915 ||  || — || January 18, 2009 || Catalina || CSS ||  || align=right | 2.6 km || 
|-id=916 bgcolor=#d6d6d6
| 509916 ||  || — || March 18, 2009 || Kitt Peak || Spacewatch ||  || align=right | 2.2 km || 
|-id=917 bgcolor=#E9E9E9
| 509917 ||  || — || April 16, 2009 || Kitami || K. Endate ||  || align=right | 2.7 km || 
|-id=918 bgcolor=#d6d6d6
| 509918 ||  || — || April 17, 2009 || Kitt Peak || Spacewatch ||  || align=right | 3.6 km || 
|-id=919 bgcolor=#d6d6d6
| 509919 ||  || — || April 18, 2009 || Piszkéstető || K. Sárneczky ||  || align=right | 3.6 km || 
|-id=920 bgcolor=#d6d6d6
| 509920 ||  || — || March 24, 2009 || Mount Lemmon || Mount Lemmon Survey ||  || align=right | 2.1 km || 
|-id=921 bgcolor=#fefefe
| 509921 ||  || — || April 20, 2009 || Kitt Peak || Spacewatch ||  || align=right data-sort-value="0.52" | 520 m || 
|-id=922 bgcolor=#fefefe
| 509922 ||  || — || May 1, 2006 || Kitt Peak || Spacewatch ||  || align=right data-sort-value="0.62" | 620 m || 
|-id=923 bgcolor=#E9E9E9
| 509923 ||  || — || April 27, 2009 || Tzec Maun || F. Tozzi ||  || align=right | 2.9 km || 
|-id=924 bgcolor=#d6d6d6
| 509924 ||  || — || December 31, 2007 || Mount Lemmon || Mount Lemmon Survey ||  || align=right | 3.3 km || 
|-id=925 bgcolor=#C2FFFF
| 509925 ||  || — || April 29, 2009 || Mount Lemmon || Mount Lemmon Survey || L5 || align=right | 12 km || 
|-id=926 bgcolor=#d6d6d6
| 509926 ||  || — || July 15, 2009 || La Sagra || OAM Obs. ||  || align=right | 4.5 km || 
|-id=927 bgcolor=#FA8072
| 509927 ||  || — || December 6, 2007 || Mount Lemmon || Mount Lemmon Survey || H || align=right data-sort-value="0.71" | 710 m || 
|-id=928 bgcolor=#fefefe
| 509928 ||  || — || July 20, 2009 || La Sagra || OAM Obs. ||  || align=right data-sort-value="0.86" | 860 m || 
|-id=929 bgcolor=#fefefe
| 509929 ||  || — || July 27, 2009 || La Sagra || OAM Obs. ||  || align=right data-sort-value="0.93" | 930 m || 
|-id=930 bgcolor=#fefefe
| 509930 ||  || — || July 25, 2009 || La Sagra || OAM Obs. ||  || align=right data-sort-value="0.98" | 980 m || 
|-id=931 bgcolor=#d6d6d6
| 509931 ||  || — || July 25, 2009 || La Sagra || OAM Obs. ||  || align=right | 3.4 km || 
|-id=932 bgcolor=#fefefe
| 509932 ||  || — || July 29, 2009 || Kitt Peak || Spacewatch ||  || align=right data-sort-value="0.74" | 740 m || 
|-id=933 bgcolor=#fefefe
| 509933 ||  || — || August 15, 2009 || La Sagra || OAM Obs. || V || align=right data-sort-value="0.94" | 940 m || 
|-id=934 bgcolor=#fefefe
| 509934 ||  || — || August 15, 2009 || Kitt Peak || Spacewatch || NYS || align=right data-sort-value="0.50" | 500 m || 
|-id=935 bgcolor=#FFC2E0
| 509935 ||  || — || August 20, 2009 || Catalina || CSS || APOPHA || align=right data-sort-value="0.47" | 470 m || 
|-id=936 bgcolor=#fefefe
| 509936 ||  || — || August 19, 2009 || La Sagra || OAM Obs. || NYS || align=right data-sort-value="0.58" | 580 m || 
|-id=937 bgcolor=#fefefe
| 509937 ||  || — || August 16, 2009 || La Sagra || OAM Obs. ||  || align=right data-sort-value="0.72" | 720 m || 
|-id=938 bgcolor=#fefefe
| 509938 ||  || — || August 15, 2009 || Kitt Peak || Spacewatch ||  || align=right data-sort-value="0.75" | 750 m || 
|-id=939 bgcolor=#fefefe
| 509939 ||  || — || August 20, 2009 || La Sagra || OAM Obs. ||  || align=right data-sort-value="0.73" | 730 m || 
|-id=940 bgcolor=#d6d6d6
| 509940 ||  || — || August 15, 2009 || Kitt Peak || Spacewatch || EUP || align=right | 3.7 km || 
|-id=941 bgcolor=#d6d6d6
| 509941 ||  || — || August 16, 2009 || La Sagra || OAM Obs. ||  || align=right | 3.5 km || 
|-id=942 bgcolor=#fefefe
| 509942 ||  || — || August 28, 2009 || Catalina || CSS ||  || align=right data-sort-value="0.99" | 990 m || 
|-id=943 bgcolor=#fefefe
| 509943 ||  || — || August 27, 2009 || Kitt Peak || Spacewatch ||  || align=right data-sort-value="0.59" | 590 m || 
|-id=944 bgcolor=#fefefe
| 509944 ||  || — || September 12, 2009 || Kitt Peak || Spacewatch || MAS || align=right data-sort-value="0.62" | 620 m || 
|-id=945 bgcolor=#fefefe
| 509945 ||  || — || September 12, 2009 || Kitt Peak || Spacewatch || MAS || align=right data-sort-value="0.54" | 540 m || 
|-id=946 bgcolor=#fefefe
| 509946 ||  || — || September 15, 2009 || Kitt Peak || Spacewatch || CLA || align=right | 1.4 km || 
|-id=947 bgcolor=#fefefe
| 509947 ||  || — || September 13, 2009 || Socorro || LINEAR ||  || align=right data-sort-value="0.73" | 730 m || 
|-id=948 bgcolor=#fefefe
| 509948 ||  || — || July 29, 2009 || Catalina || CSS ||  || align=right | 1.7 km || 
|-id=949 bgcolor=#fefefe
| 509949 ||  || — || August 29, 2009 || Kitt Peak || Spacewatch ||  || align=right data-sort-value="0.65" | 650 m || 
|-id=950 bgcolor=#fefefe
| 509950 ||  || — || September 16, 2009 || Kitt Peak || Spacewatch || MAS || align=right data-sort-value="0.62" | 620 m || 
|-id=951 bgcolor=#E9E9E9
| 509951 ||  || — || March 27, 2008 || Kitt Peak || Spacewatch ||  || align=right | 2.1 km || 
|-id=952 bgcolor=#fefefe
| 509952 ||  || — || January 27, 2007 || Kitt Peak || Spacewatch ||  || align=right data-sort-value="0.70" | 700 m || 
|-id=953 bgcolor=#fefefe
| 509953 ||  || — || September 17, 2009 || Kitt Peak || Spacewatch || MAS || align=right data-sort-value="0.63" | 630 m || 
|-id=954 bgcolor=#d6d6d6
| 509954 ||  || — || September 17, 2009 || Kitt Peak || Spacewatch || 7:4 || align=right | 5.0 km || 
|-id=955 bgcolor=#fefefe
| 509955 ||  || — || August 18, 2009 || Kitt Peak || Spacewatch ||  || align=right data-sort-value="0.73" | 730 m || 
|-id=956 bgcolor=#fefefe
| 509956 ||  || — || September 18, 2009 || Kitt Peak || Spacewatch || NYS || align=right data-sort-value="0.60" | 600 m || 
|-id=957 bgcolor=#fefefe
| 509957 ||  || — || September 19, 2009 || Kitt Peak || Spacewatch ||  || align=right data-sort-value="0.70" | 700 m || 
|-id=958 bgcolor=#fefefe
| 509958 ||  || — || August 27, 2009 || Catalina || CSS ||  || align=right data-sort-value="0.64" | 640 m || 
|-id=959 bgcolor=#fefefe
| 509959 ||  || — || July 5, 2005 || Kitt Peak || Spacewatch ||  || align=right data-sort-value="0.64" | 640 m || 
|-id=960 bgcolor=#fefefe
| 509960 ||  || — || September 21, 2009 || Kitt Peak || Spacewatch || NYS || align=right data-sort-value="0.70" | 700 m || 
|-id=961 bgcolor=#fefefe
| 509961 ||  || — || September 22, 2009 || Kitt Peak || Spacewatch ||  || align=right data-sort-value="0.70" | 700 m || 
|-id=962 bgcolor=#fefefe
| 509962 ||  || — || September 22, 2009 || Kitt Peak || Spacewatch ||  || align=right data-sort-value="0.63" | 630 m || 
|-id=963 bgcolor=#fefefe
| 509963 ||  || — || September 21, 2009 || Kitt Peak || Spacewatch ||  || align=right data-sort-value="0.79" | 790 m || 
|-id=964 bgcolor=#d6d6d6
| 509964 ||  || — || August 29, 2009 || Catalina || CSS ||  || align=right | 3.2 km || 
|-id=965 bgcolor=#fefefe
| 509965 ||  || — || September 21, 2009 || Mount Lemmon || Mount Lemmon Survey ||  || align=right data-sort-value="0.61" | 610 m || 
|-id=966 bgcolor=#fefefe
| 509966 ||  || — || September 25, 2009 || Kitt Peak || Spacewatch ||  || align=right data-sort-value="0.71" | 710 m || 
|-id=967 bgcolor=#fefefe
| 509967 ||  || — || September 17, 2009 || Kitt Peak || Spacewatch ||  || align=right data-sort-value="0.65" | 650 m || 
|-id=968 bgcolor=#fefefe
| 509968 ||  || — || September 19, 2009 || Kitt Peak || Spacewatch || MAS || align=right data-sort-value="0.59" | 590 m || 
|-id=969 bgcolor=#fefefe
| 509969 ||  || — || September 21, 2009 || Catalina || CSS ||  || align=right data-sort-value="0.89" | 890 m || 
|-id=970 bgcolor=#fefefe
| 509970 ||  || — || September 20, 2009 || Kitt Peak || Spacewatch ||  || align=right data-sort-value="0.62" | 620 m || 
|-id=971 bgcolor=#fefefe
| 509971 ||  || — || August 29, 2009 || Kitt Peak || Spacewatch || MAS || align=right data-sort-value="0.62" | 620 m || 
|-id=972 bgcolor=#fefefe
| 509972 ||  || — || September 26, 2009 || Kitt Peak || Spacewatch ||  || align=right data-sort-value="0.65" | 650 m || 
|-id=973 bgcolor=#fefefe
| 509973 ||  || — || September 16, 2009 || Kitt Peak || Spacewatch ||  || align=right data-sort-value="0.68" | 680 m || 
|-id=974 bgcolor=#fefefe
| 509974 ||  || — || September 16, 2009 || Kitt Peak || Spacewatch || NYS || align=right data-sort-value="0.54" | 540 m || 
|-id=975 bgcolor=#fefefe
| 509975 ||  || — || October 15, 2009 || Mayhill || A. Lowe ||  || align=right | 1.3 km || 
|-id=976 bgcolor=#fefefe
| 509976 ||  || — || September 27, 2009 || Mount Lemmon || Mount Lemmon Survey || H || align=right data-sort-value="0.72" | 720 m || 
|-id=977 bgcolor=#fefefe
| 509977 ||  || — || September 20, 2009 || Mount Lemmon || Mount Lemmon Survey ||  || align=right data-sort-value="0.88" | 880 m || 
|-id=978 bgcolor=#fefefe
| 509978 ||  || — || September 16, 2009 || Catalina || CSS ||  || align=right data-sort-value="0.85" | 850 m || 
|-id=979 bgcolor=#fefefe
| 509979 ||  || — || October 15, 2009 || La Sagra || OAM Obs. ||  || align=right data-sort-value="0.80" | 800 m || 
|-id=980 bgcolor=#fefefe
| 509980 ||  || — || October 11, 2009 || Mount Lemmon || Mount Lemmon Survey || NYS || align=right data-sort-value="0.60" | 600 m || 
|-id=981 bgcolor=#FA8072
| 509981 ||  || — || October 14, 2009 || La Sagra || OAM Obs. ||  || align=right data-sort-value="0.86" | 860 m || 
|-id=982 bgcolor=#fefefe
| 509982 ||  || — || October 14, 2009 || Mount Lemmon || Mount Lemmon Survey || NYS || align=right data-sort-value="0.72" | 720 m || 
|-id=983 bgcolor=#fefefe
| 509983 ||  || — || October 23, 2009 || Catalina || CSS || H || align=right data-sort-value="0.75" | 750 m || 
|-id=984 bgcolor=#fefefe
| 509984 ||  || — || October 22, 2009 || Mount Lemmon || Mount Lemmon Survey ||  || align=right data-sort-value="0.75" | 750 m || 
|-id=985 bgcolor=#FA8072
| 509985 ||  || — || October 22, 2009 || Catalina || CSS ||  || align=right data-sort-value="0.49" | 490 m || 
|-id=986 bgcolor=#fefefe
| 509986 ||  || — || October 17, 2009 || Mount Lemmon || Mount Lemmon Survey || H || align=right data-sort-value="0.56" | 560 m || 
|-id=987 bgcolor=#fefefe
| 509987 ||  || — || October 22, 2009 || Mount Lemmon || Mount Lemmon Survey ||  || align=right data-sort-value="0.71" | 710 m || 
|-id=988 bgcolor=#fefefe
| 509988 ||  || — || October 1, 2005 || Mount Lemmon || Mount Lemmon Survey || MAS || align=right data-sort-value="0.65" | 650 m || 
|-id=989 bgcolor=#fefefe
| 509989 ||  || — || October 23, 2009 || Kitt Peak || Spacewatch ||  || align=right data-sort-value="0.71" | 710 m || 
|-id=990 bgcolor=#fefefe
| 509990 ||  || — || September 20, 2009 || Kitt Peak || Spacewatch ||  || align=right data-sort-value="0.62" | 620 m || 
|-id=991 bgcolor=#fefefe
| 509991 ||  || — || October 26, 2009 || Bisei SG Center || BATTeRS ||  || align=right data-sort-value="0.75" | 750 m || 
|-id=992 bgcolor=#E9E9E9
| 509992 ||  || — || October 18, 2009 || Mount Lemmon || Mount Lemmon Survey ||  || align=right data-sort-value="0.88" | 880 m || 
|-id=993 bgcolor=#fefefe
| 509993 ||  || — || October 22, 2009 || Mount Lemmon || Mount Lemmon Survey ||  || align=right data-sort-value="0.78" | 780 m || 
|-id=994 bgcolor=#FA8072
| 509994 ||  || — || October 12, 2009 || Socorro || LINEAR || H || align=right data-sort-value="0.82" | 820 m || 
|-id=995 bgcolor=#fefefe
| 509995 ||  || — || November 9, 2009 || Mount Lemmon || Mount Lemmon Survey ||  || align=right | 1.00 km || 
|-id=996 bgcolor=#fefefe
| 509996 ||  || — || September 6, 2005 || Anderson Mesa || LONEOS ||  || align=right data-sort-value="0.79" | 790 m || 
|-id=997 bgcolor=#fefefe
| 509997 ||  || — || November 9, 2009 || Mount Lemmon || Mount Lemmon Survey || NYS || align=right data-sort-value="0.64" | 640 m || 
|-id=998 bgcolor=#fefefe
| 509998 ||  || — || October 14, 2009 || Mount Lemmon || Mount Lemmon Survey ||  || align=right | 1.8 km || 
|-id=999 bgcolor=#fefefe
| 509999 ||  || — || November 9, 2009 || Mount Lemmon || Mount Lemmon Survey ||  || align=right data-sort-value="0.70" | 700 m || 
|-id=000 bgcolor=#fefefe
| 510000 ||  || — || September 11, 2005 || Kitt Peak || Spacewatch ||  || align=right data-sort-value="0.53" | 530 m || 
|}

References

External links 
 Discovery Circumstances: Numbered Minor Planets (505001)–(510000) (IAU Minor Planet Center)

0509